= Advisory Committee on Human Radiation Experiments =

1994–95 committee to investigate US government human experiments

The Advisory Committee on Human Radiation Experiments was established in 1994 to investigate questions of the record of the United States government with respect to human radiation experiments. The special committee was created by President Bill Clinton in Executive Order 12891, issued January 15, 1994. Ruth Faden of The Johns Hopkins Berman Institute of Bioethics chaired the committee.

The thousand-page final report of the Committee was released in October 1995 at a White House ceremony.

== Background ==
The scandal first came to public attention in a newsletter called Science Trends in 1976 and in Mother Jones magazine in 1981. Mother Jones reporter Howard Rosenburg used the Freedom of Information Act to gather hundreds of documents to investigate total radiation studies which were done at the Oak Ridge Institute for Nuclear Studies (now the Oak Ridge Institute for Science and Education). The Mother Jones article triggered a hearing before the Subcommittee on Investigations and Oversight of the House Science and Technology Committee. Congressman Al Gore of Tennessee chaired the hearing. Gore's subcommittee report stated that the radiation experiments were "satisfactory, but not perfect."

In November 1986, a report by the staff of Massachusetts Congressman Ed Markey was released, but received only cursory media coverage. Entitled "American Nuclear Guinea Pigs: Three decades of radiation experiments on U.S. citizens", the report stated that there had been 31 human radiation experiments involving nearly 700 people. Markey urged the Department of Energy to make every effort to find the experimental subjects and compensate them for damages, which did not occur. DOE officials knew who had conducted the experiments, and the names of some of the subjects. After the report was released, President Ronald Reagan and Vice-President George H. W. Bush resisted opening investigations of the radiation experiments.

The Markey report found that between 1945 and 1947, eighteen hospital patients were injected with plutonium. The doctors selected patients likely to die in the near future. Despite the doctors' prognoses, several lived for decades after. Ebb Cade was an unwilling participant in medical experiments that involved injection of 4.7 micrograms of Plutonium on 10 April 1945 at Oak Ridge, Tennessee. This experiment was under the supervision of Harold Hodge.

The Markey report stated: "Although these experiments did provide information on the retention and absorption of radioactive material by the human body, the experiments are nonetheless repugnant because human subjects were essentially used as guinea pigs and calibration devices."

== Investigative report ==
Triggering the Advisory Committee on Human Radiation Experiments was a series of Pulitzer Prize winning investigative reports by Eileen Welsome in The Albuquerque Tribune, entitled The Plutonium Experiment, published as a series starting on November 15, 1993. This report was different than Markey's, because Welsome revealed the names of the people injected with plutonium. Welsome originally discovered the experiments while sifting through some documents at Kirtland Air Force Base in Albuquerque in the spring of 1987. What got her curiosity was a report on radioactive animal carcasses. The report identified the victims only by code names. After receiving the 1994 Pulitzer Prize for her article, Welsome would go on to publish much more information in 1999 in a book titled The Plutonium Files: America's Secret Medical Experiments in the Cold War.

== See also ==
- Albert Stevens
- Experimentation on prisoners
- Harold Hodge
- Human experimentation in the United States
- Human radiation experiments
- James M. Gates Jr.
- Ruth Faden
