= Albert Stevens =

Subject of radiation experiment (1887–1966)

- Albert Stevens
- Born: 1887
- Died: January 9, 1966 (aged 78–79)
- Resting place: Cremains in storage at Argonne National Laboratory and Washington State University
- Occupation: House painter
- Known for: Surviving the highest known radiation dose in any human

Albert Stevens (1887–1966), also known as patient CAL-1, was an American house painter from Ohio who was subjected to an involuntary human radiation experiment and survived the highest known accumulated radiation dose in any human. On May 14, 1945, he was injected with 131 kBq (3.55 μCi) of plutonium without his knowledge because it was erroneously believed that he had a terminal disease.

Plutonium remained present in his body for the remainder of his life, the amount decaying slowly through radioactive decay and biological elimination. Stevens died of heart disease some 20 years later, having accumulated an effective radiation dose of 64 Sv (6400 rem) over that period, i.e. an average of 3 Sv per year or 350 μSv/h. The current annual permitted dose for a radiation worker in the United States is 0.05 Sv (or 5 rem), i.e. an average of 5.7 μSv/h.

== Background ==
Plutonium was first synthesized in 1940 and isolated in 1941 by chemists at the University of California, Berkeley. Early research (pre-1944) was carried out on small samples manufactured using a cyclotron. The Manhattan Project built mass scale production facilities for the war effort, specifically for the manufacture of nuclear weapons. In November 1943, the X-10 Graphite Reactor at the Oak Ridge National Laboratory began producing significant amounts of the element, and industrial–scale production began in March 1945 with the commissioning of the B Reactor at the Hanford Site in Washington State. The plutonium produced by the B-reactor was earmarked for the implosion-type, plutonium cored nuclear weapons that were being developed as part of the Manhattan Project. Of the three nuclear weapons made during the war, two of them used plutonium as their fissile material.

Plutonium was handled extensively by chemists, technicians, and physicists taking part in the Manhattan Project, but the effects of plutonium exposure on the human body were largely unknown. A few mishaps in 1944 had caused certain alarm amongst project leaders, and contamination was becoming a major problem in and outside the laboratories. Plutonium was tracked into civilian areas, plutonium dust was being inhaled by workers, and accidental ingestion was a grave concern for those who routinely handled it. In August 1944, a chemist named Donald Mastick was sprayed in the face with liquid plutonium chloride, causing him to accidentally swallow some.

== Manhattan Project ==
Plutonium-238 and plutonium-239 are exceedingly difficult to detect inside the body because they are alpha particle emitters. Unlike the case of radium, which can be detected quite easily, there are no gamma rays to detect from outside the body. As long as a person is alive, the simplest way to detect plutonium would be to analyze a person's excretion through urine and feces. Unfortunately, this method has its limits in that only a small fraction of Pu is excreted, for example 0.01% of the body burden per day is typical, 2 to 3 weeks after exposure.

As the Manhattan Project continued to use plutonium, airborne contamination began to be a major concern. Nose swipes were taken frequently of the workers, with numerous cases of moderate and high readings. While Dr. Robert Stone was the Health Director at the Met Lab in 1944, lead chemist Glenn Seaborg, discoverer of many transuranium elements including plutonium, urged that a safety program be developed and suggested: "that a program to trace the course of plutonium in the body be initiated as soon as possible ... [with] the very highest priority."

Tracer experiments were begun in 1944 with rats and other animals with the knowledge of all of the Manhattan Project managers and health directors of the various sites. In 1945, human tracer experiments began with the intent to determine how to properly analyze excretion samples to estimate body burden. Numerous analytic methods were devised by the lead doctors at the Met Lab (Chicago), Los Alamos, Rochester, Oak Ridge, and Berkeley. The first human plutonium injection experiments were approved in April 1945 for three tests: April 10 at the Manhattan Project Army Hospital in Oak Ridge, April 26 at Billings Hospital in Chicago, and May 14 at the University of California Hospital in San Francisco. Albert Stevens was the person selected in the California test and designated CAL-1 in official documents.

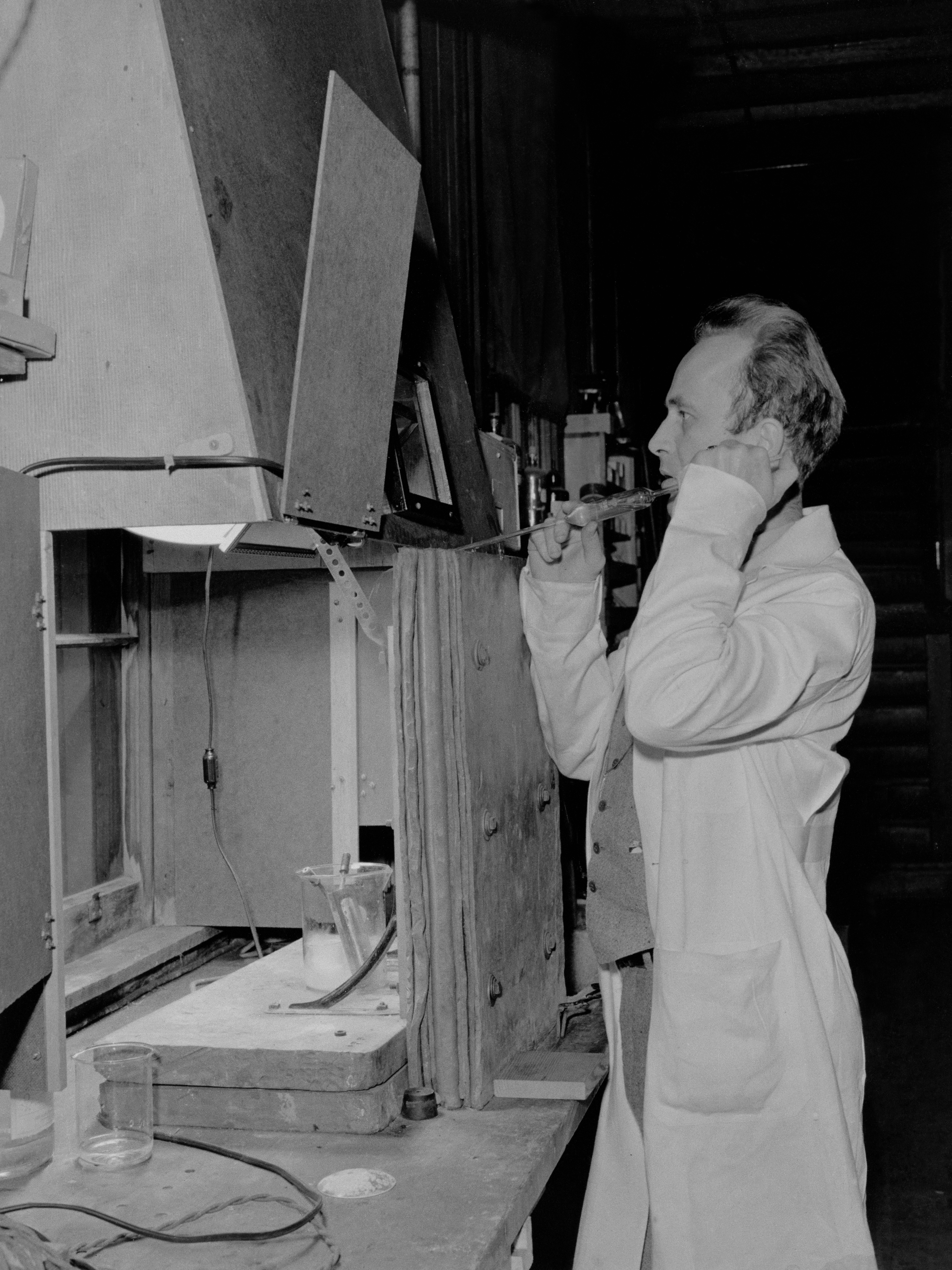
Joseph G. Hamilton was the primary researcher for the human plutonium experiments done at U.C. San Francisco from 1944 to 1947. Hamilton wrote a memo in 1950 discouraging further human experiments because the AEC would be left open "to considerable criticism", since the experiments as proposed had "a little of the Buchenwald touch."

The plutonium experiments were not isolated events. During this time, cancer researchers were attempting to discover whether certain radioactive elements might be useful to treat cancer. Recent studies on radium, polonium, and uranium proved foundational to the study of Pu toxicity. For example, polonium (another alpha emitter) research indicated that test sample contamination was a major concern, which is why a cleanroom had to be established at Los Alamos in February 1945 in the Medical Labs Building.

Behind this human experiment with plutonium was Dr. Joseph Gilbert Hamilton, a Manhattan Project doctor in charge of the human experiments in California. Hamilton had been experimenting on people (including himself) since the 1930s at Berkeley. He was working with other Manhattan Project doctors to perform toxicity studies on plutonium. It was Hamilton who had begun the 1944 tracer experiments on rats. The opportunity to select a human patient was relatively easy: Hamilton was not only a physicist assigned to U.C. Berkeley, he was "professor of experimental medicine and radiology" at U.C. San Francisco. Hamilton eventually succumbed to the radiation that he explored for most of his adult life: he died of leukemia at the age of 49.

Although Stevens was the person who received the highest dose of radiation during the plutonium experiments, he was neither the first nor the last subject to be studied. Eighteen people aged 4 to 69 were injected with plutonium. Subjects who were chosen for the experiment had been diagnosed, sometimes falsely, with a terminal disease. They lived from six days up to 44 years past the time of their injection. Eight of the 18 died within two years of the injection. All were logged as having presumably died from their respective preexisting terminal or cardiac illnesses. None died from the plutonium alone. Patients from Rochester, Chicago, and Oak Ridge were also injected with plutonium in the Manhattan Project human experiments.

As with all radiological testing during World War II, it would have been difficult to receive informed consent for Pu injection studies on civilians. Within the Manhattan Project, plutonium was referred to often by its code designation "49" (from its atomic number 94 and its atomic mass 239) or simply the "product". Few outside of the Manhattan Project would have known of plutonium, much less of the dangers of radioactive isotopes inside the body. There is no evidence that Stevens had any idea that he was the subject of a secret government experiment in which he would be subjected to a substance that would have no benefit to his health.

== Experiment on Stevens ==
Stevens was a house painter, originally from Ohio, who had settled in California in the 1920s with his wife. He had checked into the University of California Hospital in San Francisco with a gastric ulcer that was misdiagnosed as terminal cancer. According to Earl Miller, acting chief of radiology at the time, he was chosen for this study because "he was doomed" to die.

Stevens was injected with a mixture of plutonium isotopes having the Pu(VI) chemical species (Pu^{6+}) as the nitrate PuO_{2}(NO_{3})_{2}. The injection consisted of 0.2 micrograms of ^{238}Pu and 0.75 micrograms of ^{239}Pu. According to Kenneth Scott (a scientist who worked at the U.C. Berkeley Rad Lab alongside Dr. John H. Lawrence and his brother, Nobel laureate Ernest Lawrence), U.C. San Francisco radiologist Earl Miller injected the plutonium into Albert's body. Scott transported the plutonium from the lab to the hospital where Albert Stevens was being treated for stomach cancer. Miller repeatedly denied that he injected plutonium.

According to Scott, "Albert Stevens got many times the so-called lethal textbook dose of plutonium."

Although the original estimates (and some later figures) concerning the activity of the injected solution were erroneous, modern research indicates that Stevens (who weighed 58 kilograms (128 lb)) was injected with 3.5 μCi ^{238}Pu, and 0.046 μCi ^{239}Pu, giving him an initial body burden of 3.546 μCi total activity. The fact that he had the highly radioactive Pu-238 (produced in the 60-inch cyclotron at the Crocker Laboratory by deuteron bombardment of natural uranium) contributed heavily to his long-term dose. Had all of the plutonium given to Stevens been the long-lived Pu-239 as used in similar experiments of the time, Stevens's lifetime dose would have been significantly smaller. The short half-life of 87.7 years of Pu-238 means that a large amount of it decayed during its time inside his body, especially when compared to the 24,100 year half-life of Pu-239.

When specimens were taken during Stevens's cancer surgery, Earl Miller took them for radiological testing; Scott collected urine and stool samples. When the hospital's pathologist analyzed the materials removed from Stevens during surgery, a startling conclusion was made: Stevens had no cancer. Evidence was that surgeons removed a "benign gastric ulcer with chronic inflammation." The hospital staff reacted with disbelief. There had been no reason for surgery, although the size of the inflammation was extraordinary. There had also been no therapeutic intent for the experiment, although surgeons assumed that Stevens had received radioactive phosphorus for "special studies".

While at the hospital, "both a radiologist and a surgical consultant concluded that Albert probably had cancer but suggested a gastroscopy be done to confirm the diagnosis." This had never been done. Prior to Stevens's trip to the hospital, "A local physician suspected Albert had a malignant ulcer that had spread to the liver and advised him to consult specialists at the University of California Hospital." Stevens's surgeons found a "huge, ulcerating, carcinomatous mass that had grown into his spleen and liver... Half of the left lobe of the liver, the entire spleen, most of the ninth rib, lymph nodes, part of the pancreas, and a portion of the omentum... were taken out" to help prevent the spread of cancer that Stevens did not have.

== After surgery ==
Once Stevens was out of surgery, his urine and stool samples were analyzed for plutonium activity. The Pu-238 helped the researchers in this respect because it was much easier to detect. But as Stevens's condition improved and his medical bills soared, he was sent home to recover. The Manhattan District decided to pay for his urine and stool samples to keep him close to San Francisco on the pretext that his "cancer" surgery and remarkable recovery were being studied.

According to Stevens's surviving son Thomas, Stevens kept samples in a shed behind his house for storage; an intern and a nurse would pick them up once a week. The original data from Stevens's stool and urine samples was collected for 340 days post-injection. Kenneth Scott analyzed the samples, but he never told Stevens the true reason for collecting them; he also recalled that Stevens's sister was a nurse and quite suspicious. Whenever Stevens had continued health problems, he would return to the University of California, San Francisco Medical Center (UCSF) and receive free gastro-intestinal lab work by Dr. Robert Stone, a radiologist who performed extensive human experiments in the 1940s. About 10 years after the injection, a "radiologist noted 'rather marked' degeneration in the lumbar region of his spine and several degenerating discs." Plutonium, like radium and many other heavy metals, accumulates in the bones.

None of the people at UCSF or those who treated Stevens ever explained to Stevens that he did not have cancer, nor did they disclose to him that he was a part of an experiment; his wife and daughter "figured they were using him for a guinea pig", but that the experimental treatment had worked. Thomas Stevens, Albert's son, always filled out medical forms indicating that there was a "history of cancer" in his family because his father had been led to believe that the "treatment" for his cancer had worked.

Stevens received approximately 6400 rem (64 Sv) in the 20 years after his injection, or about 300 rem (3 Sv) per year. As of 2012, the annual, whole-body dose permitted to radiation workers in the United States is 5 rem; Stevens's total dose was approximately 60 times this amount.

He died on January 9, 1966, of cardiorespiratory failure (heart disease) at the age of 79. His cremated remains were shipped to the Argonne National Laboratory Center for Human Radiobiology in 1975, but they were never returned to the chapel which held them from 1966 to 1975. Some of the ashes were transferred to the National Human Radiobiology Tissue Repository at Washington State University, which keeps the remains of people who died having radioisotopes in their body.

In a 1975 study of the eighteen people who received plutonium injections in Manhattan Project experiments, CAL-1 (Albert Stevens) was shown to have received by far the highest dose to his bones and liver, calculated as 580 and 1460 rad, respectively. The dose of 580 rad was calculated based on the "average skeletal dose" contributed from the two radionuclides Pu-238 (575 rad) and Pu-239 (7.7 rad). This was then converted to the bone's surface dose, which was 7,420 rad. Stevens's absorbed dose was almost entirely based on the Pu-238 in his system. One of the findings of the 1975 study was that Stevens and five others injected with plutonium had endured "doses high enough to be considered carcinogenic. However, no bone tumors have yet appeared." The word "yet" reflected the fact that four other subjects were still alive in 1975.

== Investigative journalism ==
Pulitzer Prize–winning author Eileen Welsome wrote extensively about Stevens and other unwitting subjects of similar experiments in The Plutonium Files: America's Secret Medical Experiments in the Cold War in 1999. She had uncovered the stories and published a series of articles in 1993 detailing the identification of CAL-1, CAL-2 (4-year-old Simeon Shaw), CAL-3 (Elmer Allen), and others. Her work brought intense scrutiny on the wartime experiments which made Stevens famous, posthumously, for his contributions to science without informed consent. Shortly after the article was published in November 1993, the Secretary of Energy, Hazel O'Leary, publicly stated that the government should compensate victims. Responding to the issues revealed by Welsome, President Bill Clinton ordered the formation of the Advisory Committee on Human Radiation Experiments on January 15, 1994, to investigate. Welsome was highly critical of the committee's final report, which was released in 1995.

== See also ==
- Radiation hormesis
- Eric Voice – voluntarily took part in a plutonium injection experiment
- Alvin C. Graves
- Karen Silkwood
- Henrietta Lacks
- Unethical human experimentation in the United States
