= The Plutonium Files =

1999 non-fiction book by Eileen Welsome

The Plutonium Files: America's Secret Medical Experiments in the Cold War
- Author: Eileen Welsome
- Publisher: The Dial Press
- Publication date: 1999
- ISBN: 978-0-385-31402-2

The Plutonium Files: America's Secret Medical Experiments in the Cold War is a 1999 book by Eileen Welsome. It is a history of United States government-engineered radiation experiments on unwitting Americans, based on the Pulitzer Prize-winning series Welsome wrote for The Albuquerque Tribune.

== Overview ==
The experiments began in 1945, when Manhattan Project scientists were preparing to detonate the first atomic bomb. Radiation was known to be dangerous and the experiments were designed to ascertain the detailed effect of radiation on human health.

From 1945 to 1947, 18 people were injected with plutonium by Manhattan project doctors. Ebb Cade was an unwilling participant in medical experiments that involved injection of 4.7 micrograms of plutonium on April 10, 1945 at Oak Ridge, Tennessee. This experiment was under the supervision of Harold Hodge. Other experiments directed by the United States Atomic Energy Commission continued into the 1970s. The Plutonium Files chronicles the lives of the subjects of the secret program by naming each person involved and discussing the ethical and medical research conducted in secret by the scientists and doctors. Albert Stevens, the man who survived the highest known accumulated radiation dose in any human, four-year-old Simeon Shaw sent from Australia to the U.S. for treatment, and Elmer Allen are some of the notable subjects of the Manhattan Project program led by Joseph Gilbert Hamilton.

== Subjects ==
The following table lists subjects of the experiments by their subject names. 17 out of 18 have been identified in The Plutonium Files.

Patient number and biographical information at time of injection	Name	Date injected	Date of death	Survival time	Age at death	Cause of death	Weight of injected Pu-239 (microgram)
HP-12, 55-year-old man	Ebb Cade	1945	1953	8 years	63	Heart failure	4.7
CHI-1, 68-year-old man	Arthur Hubbard	1945	1945	5 months	68	Cancer of chin, lungs	6.5
CAL-1, 58-year-old man	Albert Stevens	1945	1966	20.7 years	79	Heart disease	0.75 + 0.2 (Pu-238)
HP-1, 67-year-old man	Amedio Lovecchio	1945	1960	14.2 years	81	Bronchopneumonia	4.6
HP-2, 48-year-old man	William Purcell	1945	1948	2.4 years	50	Brain disease	5.1
HP-3, 48-year-old woman	Eda Schultz Charlton	1945	1983	37.2 years	85	Acute cardiac arrest	4.9
HP-4, 18-year-old woman	Jean Daigneault	1945	1947	1.4 years	20	Cushing's syndrome	4.9
HP-5, 56-year-old man	Paul Galinger	1945	1946	5 months	57	Bronchopneumonia	5.1
CHI-2, 56-year-old woman	Una Macke	1945	1946	17 days	56	Breast cancer	94.9
CHI-3, Young adult male	Unknown	1945	1946	6 months	Unknown	Likely Hodgkin's Disease	94.9
HP-6, 44-year-old man	John Mousso	1946	1984	38 years	82	Natural death	5.3
HP-7, 59-year-old woman	Edna Bartholf	1946	1946	9 months	60	Pulmonary failure	6.3
HP-11, 69-year-old man	Harry Slack	1946	1946	6 days	69	Bronchopneumonia	6.5
HP-8, 41-year-old woman	Janet Stadt	1946	1975	29.7 years	71	Unknown	6.5
HP-9, 64-year-old man	Fred Sours	1946	1947	1.2 years	65	Bronchopneumonia	6.3
CAL-2, 4-year, 10-month old boy	Simeon Shaw	1946	1947	8 months	5	Bone cancer	2.7 + radio-cerium and yttrium
HP-10, 52-year-old man	Daniel Nelson	1946	1957	10.9 years	63	Heart disease	6.1
CAL-3, 36-year-old man	Elmer Allen	1947	1991	44 years	80	Respiratory failure	.006 (Pu-238)

Two hours after Clinton gave a speech on a report on the events, the verdict in the O.J. Simpson case was issued, and much of the media's attention was directed elsewhere.

Jonathan D. Moreno was a senior staff member of the committee. He wrote the 1999 book Undue Risk: Secret State Experiments on Humans, which covers some of the same ground as The Plutonium Files.

== See also ==
- Acres of Skin
- Experimentation on prisoners
- Ruth Faden
- Harold Hodge
- Plutopia
- Unethical human experimentation in the United States
