= James Gates Jr. =

James Gates Jr. may refer to:

- Sylvester James Gates (born 1950), American theoretical physicist
- James M. Gates Jr. (1935–2004), American military person
