= Eric Voice =

British physicist (1924–2004)

- Born: Eric H Voice; 2 June 1924; London
- Died: 11 September 2004 (aged 80); Thurso
- Education: Open University
- Known for: Advocacy of nuclear power; Being against nuclear weapons; Voluntary intake of plutonium in safety experiments
- Spouse: Joan I Lane
- Children: Two sons and one daughter
- Scientific career
- Workplaces: Boots; UKAEA, Harwell; UKAEA, Dounrray; UKAEA, Winfrith
- Thesis: The formation and structure of silicon carbide pyrolytically deposited in a fluidised bed of microspheres (1971)
- Doctoral advisor: Dr V D Scott, Materials Science

Eric Voice (2 June 1924 – 11 September 2004) was a British nuclear scientist. He was noted for being against nuclear weapons, his advocacy of nuclear power, and his voluntary intake of plutonium to check its effects.

== Biography ==
Eric H Voice was born in London on 2 June 1924, the son of Sidney Clayton Voice, bank clerk, and Christiana (née Brader). Sidney Clayton Voice died, aged 45, in mysterious circumstances: his body was found on 8 April 1936 in the Grand Union Canal, about 4 miles from his home in Wilcot Avenue, Watford. He had died before entering the water, and had been missing for 10 days.

Eric, who was 11 when this happened, was educated at Goudhurst School, Kent. From there, at age 16, he went to be a research chemist with Boots.

After the war, in 1945, he joined the UKAEA, Harwell as a research biochemist, where he stayed for 11 years. In 1956 he was made an Experimental Officer at UKAEA, Dounreay, progressing to Senior Experimental Officer in 1959 and then to Principal Scientific Officer at UKAEA, Winfrith in 1961. He returned to Dounreay in 1974.

During his UKAEA years Voice studied for a degree in chemistry at the Open University (OU), and went on to gain a PhD at Bath University of Technology; he studied under Dr (later Professor) Victor D Scott, in the department of Materials Science and the degree was awarded in 1971. Later, back in Scotland, he graduated in English, with a first-class honours BA degree from the OU in 1983, before retiring in the following year.

On 26 April 1986, one of the worst nuclear disasters in history occurred at the Chernobyl Nuclear Power Plant. Less than three weeks later, Voice was one of 14 British nuclear scientists and engineers, several of them members of the Pro-Nuclear Group at Caithness, who volunteered to help with the decontamination of the area around Chernobyl. He visited Russia several times subsequently. In 1991, following a return to Chernobyl he said in a public lecture that his findings bore out those of the recent UN-sponsored report, and that he could find no evidence of increased childhood leukemia, and that some wildlife species had multiplied many-fold. He deplored the gross exaggeration and misreporting of the aftermath as media hype. Later, following a two-week visit to Dubna, the home of JINR, Voice appealed to people in his part of the world to become pen-pals with Russians, who are “thirsting for information about life in the West”.

In the mid-1990s the National Radiological Protection Board (NRPB) undertook a series of experiments on the ingestion and inhalation of plutonium isotopes in male and female volunteers. Voice was one of the volunteers. He was also “one of two volunteers who then took the experiments a stage further. Several times a year, he would travel to Harwell and inhale plutonium-239 and -244 straight into his lungs. This was to provide information on absorption levels in the lungs, behaviour in the bloodstream and the speed at which plutonium travels to the gut. He lived in good health after the tests, and remained fit and active in his retirement”. However, there were some inconveniences. For example, an armoured van had to pick up his bodily waste from his home near Thurso; and visiting friends could be awkward – "When I arrive at people's homes with a carrier bag of bottles, people assume I've brought them a gift, but when I explain I can't use their facilities their expression are extremely comical".

Voice took a broad interest in science, and was not afraid to be controversial. In 1999 he made predictions on climate change, based on a global model and changing levels of carbon dioxide in the atmosphere: “by 2020, Scotland will see an average year-round temperature rise of about 0.8 degrees Celsius, more obvious in winter, less in summer”.

Eric Voice was an active member of heritage societies in Caithness and the north of Scotland.

=== Family ===
Voice married Joan I Lane in Basford, Nottingham in 1950. They had two sons and one daughter. He died in Thurso of motor neurone disease on 11 September 2004.

== Publications ==
- Voice, E H (1949). "The History of the Manufacture of Pencils". Transactions of the Newcomen Society. 27 (1): 131–141. doi:10.1179/tns.1949.012.
- Voice, E H (1969). "Silicon Carbide as a Fission Product Barrier in Nuclear Fuels". In Henisch, H K; Roy, R (eds.). Silicon Carbide–1968: Proceedings of the International Conference on Silicon Carbide, University Park, Pennsylvania, October 20–23, 1968. Elsevier. pp. S331–S339.
- Blackstone, R; Voice, E H (June 1971). "The expansion of silicon carbide by neutron irradiation at high temperature". Journal of Nuclear Materials. 39 (3): 319–322. Bibcode:1971JNuM...39..319B. doi:10.1016/0022-3115(71)90152-8.
- Voice, E H; Walther, H; York, J (1973). "20. The behaviour of silicon carbide coatings in the HTR". Nuclear Fuel Performance: Proceedings of an international conference held on 15-19 October 1973. London: British Nuclear Energy Society. doi:10.1680/nfp.48977. ISBN 0901948977.
- Nabielek, H; Hick, H; Wagner-Löffler, M; Voice, E H (June 1974). Performance Limits of Coated Particle Fuel, Part III: Fission Product Migration in HTR Fuel. Dorchester: AEE, Winfrith.
- Stott, M J; Voice, E H (1982). "Indicators of strong solute adsorption at container walls". Physics and Chemistry of Liquids. 12 (2): 135–140. doi:10.1080/00319108208084547.
