= Human radiation experiments =

Studies of radiation effects on humans

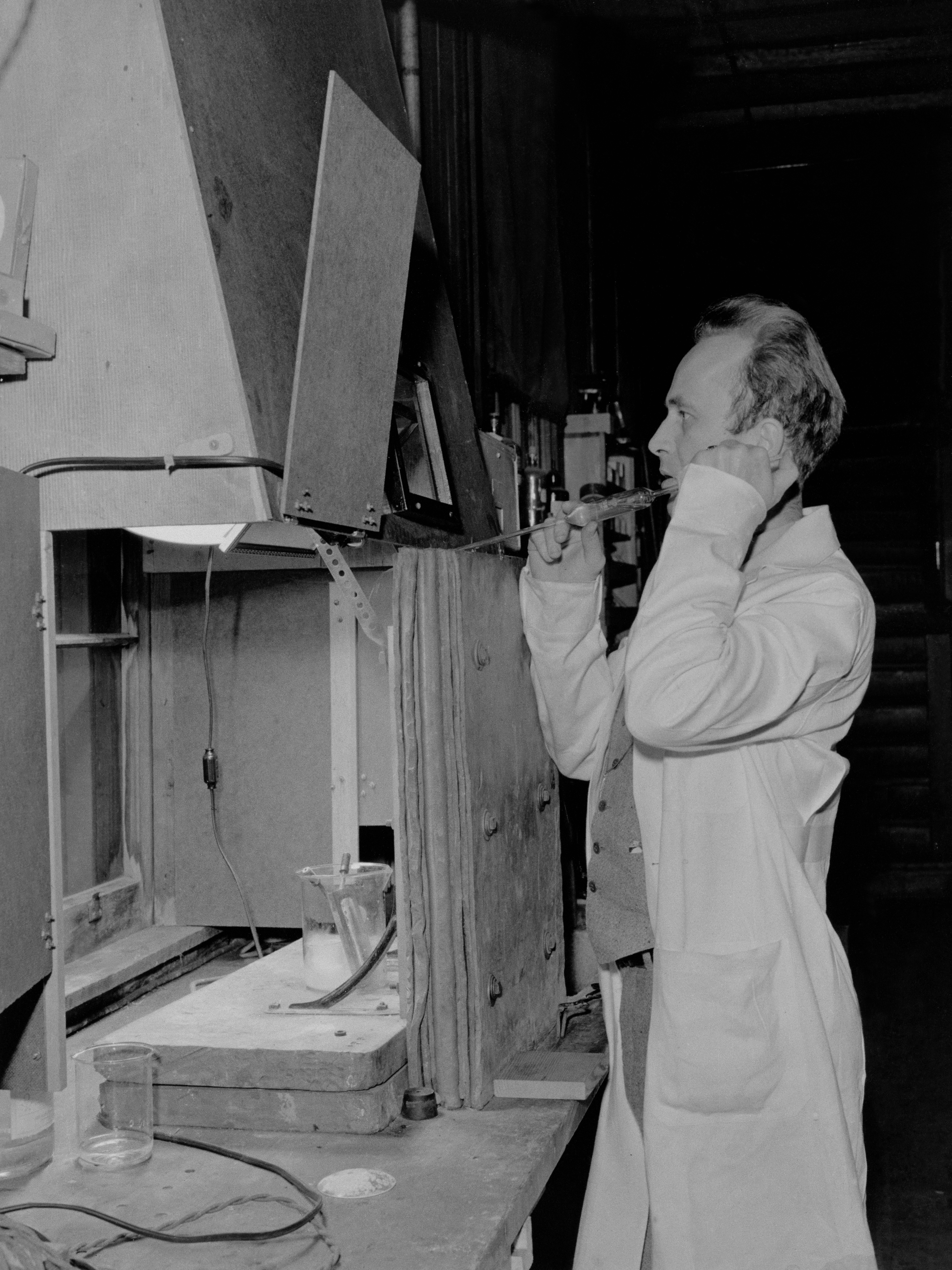
Joseph G. Hamilton was the primary researcher for the human plutonium experiments done at U.C. San Francisco from 1944 to 1947. Hamilton wrote a memo in 1950 discouraging further human experiments because the AEC would be left open "to considerable criticism," since the experiments as proposed had "a little of the Buchenwald touch."

Since the discovery of ionizing radiation, a number of human radiation experiments have been performed to understand the effects of ionizing radiation and radioactive contamination on the human body, specifically with the element plutonium.

== Experiments performed in the United States ==
Numerous human radiation experiments have been performed in the United States, many of which were funded by various U.S. government agencies such as the United States Department of Defense, the United States Atomic Energy Commission, and the United States Public Health Service. Also involved were several universities, most notably Vanderbilt University involved in several of them. The experiments included:

- directly injecting plutonium and other radioactive elements to mostly terminal patients without their consent
- feeding radioactive traces to children
- enlisting doctors to administer radioactive iron to impoverished pregnant women
- exposing U.S. soldiers and prisoners to high levels of radiation
- irradiating the testicles of prisoners, which caused severe birth defects
- exhuming bodies from graveyards to test them for radiation (without the consent of the families of the deceased)

In 1927, five-year-old Vertus Hardiman and nine other children from Lyles Station, Indiana, were severely irradiated during a medical experiment conducted at the local county hospital. To get parental consent, the experiment was misrepresented as a new therapy for the scalp fungus known as ringworm. Many of the children suffered long-term effects, but Hardiman's were the most pronounced. The radiation disfigured his head and left a large, open wound on the side of his skull. The parents of the children met with a local lawyer and filed a lawsuit against the hospital, but the hospital was found not liable.

On January 15, 1994, President Bill Clinton formed the Advisory Committee on Human Radiation Experiments (ACHRE), chaired by Ruth Faden of the Johns Hopkins Berman Institute of Bioethics. One of the primary motivating factors behind his decision to create ACHRE was a step taken by his newly appointed Secretary of Energy, Hazel O'Leary, one of whose first actions on taking the helm of the United States Department of Energy was to announce a new openness policy for the department. The new policy led almost immediately to the release of over 1.6 million pages of classified records.

These records made clear that since the 1940s, the Atomic Energy Commission had been sponsoring tests on the effects of radiation on the human body. American citizens who had checked into hospitals for a variety of ailments were secretly injected, without their knowledge, with varying amounts of plutonium and other radioactive materials.

Ebb Cade was an unwilling participant in medical experiments that involved injection of 4.7 micrograms of plutonium on 10 April 1945 at Oak Ridge, Tennessee. This experiment was under the supervision of Harold Hodge. Most patients thought it was "just another injection," but the secret studies left enough radioactive material in many of the patients' bodies to induce life-threatening conditions.

Such experiments were not limited to hospital patients, but included other populations such as those set out above, e.g., orphans fed irradiated milk, children injected with radioactive materials, and prisoners in Washington and Oregon state prisons. Much of the experimentation was carried out in order to assess how the human body metabolizes radioactive materials, information that could be used by the Departments of Energy and Defense in Cold War defense and attack planning.

ACHRE's final report was also a factor in the Department of Energy establishing an Office of Human Radiation Experiments (OHRE) that assured publication of DOE's involvement, by way of its predecessor, the AEC, in Cold War radiation research and experimentation on human subjects. The final report issued by the ACHRE can be found at the Department of Energy's website.

== Experiments performed in the United Kingdom ==
In the UK, the Coventry experiment in the 1960s involved feeding South Asian women radioactive chapatis to study iron absorption. The women were not informed of the risks and were unable to give informed consent. Researchers believe that many of the women involved may still be unaware of their involvement.

The documentary series Deadly Experiments reported that radioactive experiments had been performed at Aberdeen, Hammersmith and Liverpool hospitals in the 1950s. At least 91 pregnant women were given radioactive iodine, to test their thyroid function, iron absorption and placentas. One woman who took part claimed that she was rewarded for her participation with a place in a ward with fewer patients, access to a sitting room with a TV, and better food, but that she had also not been fully informed of the nature of the tests. The deputy chief executive of the Medical Research Council (United Kingdom), Dr. Evered, insisted that consent was obtained from every volunteer. He also said that the experiments were never secret and that the results had been widely published in scientific journals.

The UK also took part in Project SUNSHINE in 1955, providing the bodies of dead children to American scientists who used the bones to test for radiation levels. Hospitals that took part in the experiments included the Central Middlesex Hospital, the Royal Cancer Hospital in London, and other hospitals in Glasgow and Bristol.

== Soviet Union ==
The Soviet nuclear program involved human experiments on a large scale. In one notable case, the Totskoye nuclear exercise of 1954, thousands of civilians and around 45,000 members of the Red Army were exposed to radiation after an atomic bomb was detonated near them. The Russian military later denied that the explosion was radioactive, telling veterans that it was an "imitation" atomic blast. A film about the exercise was obtained in 1993, revealing the blast was in fact radioactive and that the military had access to information about the levels of radioactivity participants were exposed to. According to Radio Free Europe/Radio Liberty, more experiments were conducted at the Semipalatinsk Test Site (1949–1989). As of 1950, there were around 700,000 participants at different levels of the program, half of whom were Gulag prisoners used for radioactivity experiments, as well as the excavation of radioactive ores. Information about the scale, conditions and lethality of those involved in the program is still kept classified by the Russian government and the Rosatom agency.

== Other countries ==
In the Marshall Islands, indigenous residents and crewmembers of the fishing boat Lucky Dragon No. 5 were exposed to the high yields of radioactive testing during the Castle Bravo explosion conducted at Bikini Atoll. Researchers subsequently exploited this ostensibly "unexpected" turn of events by conducting research on the onset of effects from radiation poisoning as part of Project 4.1, raising ethical questions as to both the specific incident and the broader phenomenon of testing in populated areas.

Likewise, the Venezuelan geneticist Marcel Roche was implicated in Patrick Tierney's 2000 publication, Darkness in El Dorado, for allegedly administering radioactive iodine to indigenous peoples in the Orinoco basin of Venezuela, such as the Yanomami and Ye'Kwana peoples, in cooperation with the US Atomic Energy Commission (AEC), possibly with no apparent benefit for the test group and without obtaining proper informed consent. This corresponded to similar administrations of iodine-124 by the French anthropologist Jacques Lizot in cooperation with the French Atomic Energy Commission (CEA).

== See also ==
- Unethical human experimentation in the United States
- Project SUNSHINE
- Nuclear and radiation accidents
- Radiation poisoning
- Radioactive contamination
- Human experimentation
- Totskoye range nuclear tests
- Walter E. Fernald State School
- James M. Gates Jr.
