= Harold Hodge =

American toxicologist

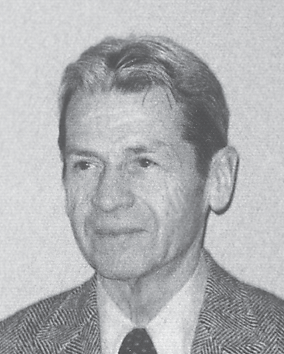
Harold Hodge, Toxicologist

Harold Carpenter Hodge (1904–1990) was a well-known toxicologist who published close to 300 papers and five books. He was the first president of the Society of Toxicology in 1960. He received a BS from Illinois Wesleyan University and a PhD in 1930 from the State University of Iowa, publishing his first paper in 1927. He received a number of honors and awards during his career.

In 1931 he went to the University of Rochester School of Medicine and Dentistry in New York where he pursued his interest in toxicology, which included researching fluoride and dental fluorosis. At that time, the government and medical associations were invested in fluoride removal from water supplies because of the incidence of dental fluorosis in communities with high levels of naturally occurring calcium fluoride, and the adverse health impacts from industrial air pollution involving fluoride. Hodge was chosen to head the United States Atomic Energy Commission's (AEC) Division of Pharmacology and Toxicology, with the help of Dr. K.L. Shourie (the AEC was the successor to the Manhattan Project), where he studied the effects of the inhalation of uranium and beryllium through the "Rochester Chamber".

Hodge's reputation was damaged by the publication of Eileen Welsome's book The Plutonium Files, for which she won a Pulitzer Prize. It documented human experiments in which the subjects did not know they were being tested to find the safety limits of uranium and plutonium. He attended a meeting where the experiments were planned in 1945, and an AEC memo thanks Hodge for his planning and suggestions in the experiment. The US government settled with the victims' families, paying $400,000 per family. Seven victims were injected with material smuggled into a hospital secretly through a tunnel. One 24-year-old woman was injected with 584 micrograms of uranium; another 61-year-old man was injected with 70 micrograms per kilogram of uranium. Hodge also arranged for Dr. Sweet to inject 11 terminally-ill patients with uranium for their brain tumors; however, these subjects may have known they were being tested.

Hodge is also singled out by BBC journalist Christopher Bryson in his book The Fluoride Deception as having played a key role in promoting the implementation of water fluoridation in the U.S., from which the water fluoridation controversy stems. Hodge's position on the Manhattan Project was connected with his knowledge of fluoride from his tenure at the School of Medicine and Dentistry in Rochester, New York. Fluorine and fluoride by-products were considered as highly dangerous and had been quite thoroughly researched by Kaj Roholm at that time. Modern toxicological profiles confirm the industrial risks inherent in working with fluorine, fluoride and hydrogen fluoride. Bryson makes the case that Hodge knowingly lied in testimony to Congress regarding the safety of fluoridation.

Hodge's papers list him as "Harold Carpenter," "Harold Hodge," and "Harold Carpenter Hodge."

== Professional service ==
- President, International Association for Dental Research, 1947-1948
- President, Society of Toxicology, 1960
- President, American Society for Pharmacology and Experimental Therapeutics, 1966-1967
- President, Association of Medical School Pharmacologists, 1968-1970

== Awards and honors ==
- Merit Award, Society of Toxicology, 1969
- Education Award, Society of Toxicology, 1975
- Award in Oral Therapeutics, International Association for Dental Research, 1965
- H. Trendley Dean Memorial Award, International Association for Dental Research, 1976
- Fauchard Gold Medal, American Dental Association, 1981
- Prize in Preventive Odontology, Swedish Patent Revenue Fund and Swedish Medical Research Council, 1987
- Doctor of Sciences (honorary), Illinois Wesleyan University
- Doctor of Sciences (honorary), Western Reserve University

The Harold C. Hodge Memorial Fund was established by the Department of Pharmacology at the University of Rochester in 1992. This endowed the annual Harold C. Hodge Lecture.

== See also ==
- Unethical human experimentation in the United States
- Sodium monofluorophosphate
- Experimentation on prisoners
- Acres of Skin
- Ruth Faden
