= James M. Gates Jr. =

James Major B. Gates (July 17, 1935 – March 20, 2004) was the last survivor of the segregated 95th Engineers Combat Battalion, which was used for human fallout exposure testing. They were stationed in closest vicinity during atomic blasting at Camp Desert Rock in Nevada in 1954. He was quoted as saying, "there is no reckoning why the government would hurt its own people."

At age 15, Gates saw combat in Korea, and was captured, jailed, and beaten. Upon returning to the United States in 1953, Jim's unit was first shipped to Ft. Leonard Wood in Missouri for eight weeks of basic and special project training, including gas exposure. In 1954, his unit was sent to Yakima Washington, where Jim and the others worked as extras in the Audie Murphy movie "To Hell and Back". Jim said the movie title was Providential. By July of that year, his unit was sent to Nevada by night-train to prevent the men going AWOL, and at that time told not to reveal what awaited them in Camp Desert Rock (below Camp Mercury) under the penalty of red balling when they became civilian.

Jim dug ditches, built fake towns and set explosive devices because he was a munitions expert. It was also his job to round up jack rabbits to put in cages, not only to be used as atomic test victims, but whose bones would mingle and cover those of sacrificed men nicknamed "Desert Rats," who were put in "monkey cages," or tied to fences closest to detonation. These acts have been documented on film, and show that the military used racial experiments with impunity.

Jim himself, was within a 1/2 mile radius from at least 7 types of bombs without other protection or cover except a trench. He was involved in a series of 14 nuclear explosions in Operation Teapot and Operation MET. One explosion blew him out of a trench and he awoke 11 days later in the military hospital finding his arm and leg undergoing surgical reconstruction. He asked then for a medical discharge, but it was denied him. Along with the other men, he ingested radioactive water and food, breathed radioactive air—all the while being counseled by military chaplains that these were harmless. To counteract this horror, Jim knew enough to act by driving out into the desert at night to cut the wires he set up that day, to create a delay in detonation. In doing so he would be arrested.

While hitching along a military border road, he was picked up by journalist Paul Jacobs. After becoming friends, Jim gave him insider knowledge. Jacobs formally interviewed him and others, publishing a series of stories which helped blow the lid off the secrecy surrounding atomic testing. Jim's testimony was included into the 1980 documentary "Paul Jacobs and the Nuclear Gang" produced by Saul Landau. Jim was also in a 1995 British production "Geiger Sweet Geiger Sour" (which movie is banned in the U.S.). After Jim's duties in Nevada, he was shipped to Germany, and then back to the United States to teach chemical, nuclear and biological warfare at Nike ABM bases.

Back in Chicago and not able to retire, he continued in the Army Reserves. Jim married and had 8 children and 29 grandchildren. He drove taxi cabs, worked in a steel mill and a post office, and opened his own restaurant. Even so, he was denied Social Security and was homeless for 12 of those years, suffering a heart attack during that time, with no insurance benefits. The radioactive poisoning had settled in his connective tissues, his lungs, joints, muscles and teeth, causing him major organ failures over the years, including a burst appendix followed by heart failure, all of which he miraculously survived to the amazement of doctors, and which two were suffered on the 40th anniversary of Operation TEAPOT.

Jim never gave up his fight for the military benefits denied him. He was interviewed many times, including a 1994 in-depth interview. This article, entitled "The Legal Fallout" was featured (front cover) in an ABA Law Journal, and caused controversy between the American Bar Association and the government. Jim also joined the Atomic Veterans Association, the Alliance of Atomic Veterans, and would attend the Vietnam Veterans Against the War rallies to befriend the homeless vets. Since 1986, he participated in civil disobedience actions against weapons testing at the Nevada Test Site. He attended rallies and conferences in Washington, New York City, San Francisco, Berkeley, Las Vegas and Chicago. He also worked closely with political leaders, including Mayor Harold Washington and Senators Carol Moseley Braun and Paul Simon. Jim's last trip to Nevada was when the Shoshone Indians gave him a memorial plaque for his friendship and concern.

Jim was able to receive a date for a landmark hearing on his case before the Court of Appeals in Washington, but died just two and a half months before he could attend. He is buried at the Abraham Lincoln National Cemetery.
