= Ebb Cade =

First person injected with plutonium (1890–1953)

- Born: March 17, 1890; Macon County, Georgia
- Died: April 13, 1953 (aged 63)
- Known for: Being the first person injected with plutonium

Ebb Cade (17 March 1890 – 13 April 1953) was a construction worker at Clinton Engineer Works in Oak Ridge, Tennessee. He was the first person subjected to injection with plutonium as an experiment.

== Life ==
Cade was born on 17 March 1890 in Macon County, Georgia, the son of Evens and Carrie Cade. Ebb Cade was married to Ida Cade. At age 63, Cade died as a result of ventricular fibrillation followed by heart failure on 13 April 1953 in Greensboro, North Carolina.

== Plutonium injection ==
On 23 March 1945 Cade was on his way to work at a construction site for the Manhattan Project when he was involved in a traffic accident at Oak Ridge, Tennessee. He was an African-American cement worker for the J.A. Jones Construction Company. Cade presented at the Oak Ridge Hospital with fractures of right patella, right radius and ulna and left femur. Hymer Friedell, deputy medical director of the Manhattan Engineer District, determined that as Cade was, as he characterized, a "well developed..well nourished" "colored male", he was suitable for "experimentation" with plutonium injection. Doctors left his fractures untreated for 20 days until after plutonium injections began on 10 April 1945. Cade received the injections at the Oak Ridge Hospital on the Clinton Engineer Works reservation without his consent or knowledge. He became known as HP-12 (Human Product-12) and was the first person to be injected with Plutonium-239. In order to test the migration of plutonium through his body, subsequently 15 of Cade's teeth were extracted and bone samples taken.

According to one account, Cade departed suddenly from the hospital on his own initiative; one morning the nurse opened his door, and he was gone. Later it was learned that he moved out of state and died of heart failure in Greensboro.

From 1945 to 1947, 18 people were part of a series of studies that involved the injection of plutonium. In Rochester, New York at Strong Memorial Hospital 11 people were injected. In Chicago, three individuals received injections at Billings Hospital of the University of Chicago. In San Francisco, California, three people were injected at the University Hospital of the University of California, San Francisco. The first person injected in California was Albert Stevens. Urine and feces samples were collected from the test subjects and forwarded to Los Alamos National Laboratory for plutonium analysis. The studies were utilized to formulate mathematical equations necessary to establish plutonium excretion rates.
