= Ruth Faden =

American scientist and academic

Chair of the Advisory Committee on Human Radiation Experiments
- In office 1994–1995
- President: Bill Clinton
- Preceded by: position established
- Succeeded by: position abolished

Personal details
- Born: Philadelphia, Pennsylvania, U.S.
- Education: University of Pennsylvania (B.A.); University of Chicago (M.A.); University of California, Berkeley (MPH, Ph.D.)

Ruth R. Faden is an American scientist, academic, and founder of the Johns Hopkins Berman Institute of Bioethics. She was the Berman Institute's Director from 1995 until 2016, and the inaugural Andreas C. Dracopoulos Director from 2014 to 2016. Faden is the inaugural Philip Franklin Wagley Professor of Biomedical Ethics.

Faden is a member of the Institute of Medicine and a Fellow of The Hastings Center and the American Psychological Association. She has served on President Clinton's Advisory Committee on Human Radiation Experiments, which she chaired. Faden co-launched the Global Food Ethics and Policy Program, sponsor of the 7 by 5 Agenda for Ethics and Global Food Security. She is also a co-founder of the Hinxton Group, a global community committed to advancing ethical and policy challenges in stem cell science, and the Second Wave initiative, an effort to ensure that the health interests of pregnant women are fairly represented in biomedical research and drug and device policies.

In 2011, Faden was the recipient of Lifetime Achievement Awards from the American Society for Bioethics and Humanities (ASBH) and Public Responsibility in Medicine and Research (PRIMR). In 2025, she was the receipient of the Bernard Lo, MD Award in Bioethics from the Greenwall Foundation.

Faden was born and raised in Philadelphia. At 16, Faden was accepted to Temple University, where she studied for two years before transferring to the University of Pennsylvania, where she earned her bachelor's degree. Faden later earned her M.A. from the University of Chicago, and her MPH and PhD from University of California, Berkeley.

== Academic work ==
Faden is the author and editor of books and articles on biomedical ethics and public policy, including Social Justice: The Moral Foundations of Public Health and Health Policy (with Madison Powers) and A History and Theory of Informed Consent (with Tom L. Beauchamp). Her latest book (also with Madison Powers) is Structural Injustice: Power, Advantage, and Human Rights.

== Publications ==
=== Books ===
- Faden, Ruth R.; Beauchamp, Tom L. (February 27, 1986). A History and Theory of Informed Consent. Oxford University Press, USA. ISBN 978-0195036862.
- Faden, Ruth R.; Kass, Nancy E., eds. (June 13, 1996). HIV, AIDS and Childbearing: Public Policy, Private Lives. Oxford University Press, USA. ISBN 978-0195099584.
- Faden, Ruth; Geller, Gail; Powers, Madison, eds. (October 10, 1991). AIDS, Women and the Next Generation: Towards a Morally Acceptable Public Policy for HIV Testing of Pregnant Women and Newborns. Oxford University Press, USA. ISBN 978-0195065725.
- Faden, Ruth; Powers, Madison (2006). Social Justice: The Moral Foundations of Public Health and Health Policy. Oxford University Press.
- Faden, Ruth; Powers, Madison (2019). Structural Injustice: Power, Advantage, and Human Rights. Oxford University Press.
