= Eileen Welsome =

American journalist and author (born 1951)

- Born: March 12, 1951 (age 75)
- Education: University of Texas at Austin
- Occupations: Journalist, Author
- Writing career
- Language: English
- Genre: Journalism
- Notable work: The Plutonium Files
- Notable awards: Pulitzer Prize for National Reporting (1994), Martha Albrand Award for First Nonfiction (2000)

Eileen Welsome (born March 12, 1951) is an American journalist and author. She received a Pulitzer Prize for National Reporting in 1994 while a reporter for The Albuquerque Tribune for a 3-part story titled "The Plutonium Experiment" published beginning on November 15, 1993. She was awarded the prize for her articles about the government's human radiation experiments conducted on unwilling and unknowing Americans during the Cold War. Welsome also has received a George Polk Award, the Selden Ring Award for Investigative Reporting, an Investigative Reporters and Editors Gold Medal, the Heywood Broun Award, as well as awards from the National Headliners Association and the Associated Press. In 1999, Welsome wrote the book The Plutonium Files: America's Secret Medical Experiments in the Cold War. In 2000, Welsome received the PEN/Martha Albrand Award for First Nonfiction and the PEN Center USA West Award in Research Nonfiction for The Plutonium Files.

Welsome began her career in journalism as a reporter for the Beaumont Enterprise. She also worked for the San Antonio Light and the San Antonio Express-News before joining The Albuquerque Tribune staff in 1987. Welsome graduated from the University of Texas at Austin in 1980 with a Bachelor of Journalism degree.

== Bibliography ==
- Welsome, Eileen. The Plutonium Files: America's Secret Medical Experiments in the Cold War. New York, N.Y.: Dial Press, 1999. ISBN 0385314027 OCLC 40805423
- Welsome, Eileen. The General and the Jaguar: Pershing's Hunt for Pancho Villa: a True Story of Revolution and Revenge. New York: Little, Brown and Co, 2006. ISBN 0316715999 OCLC 62172693
- Welsome, Eileen. Healers and Hellraisers: Denver Health's First 150 Years. Denver, CO: Denver Health Foundation, 2011. ISBN 9780615423906
- Welsome, Eileen. Deep Roots: AspenPointe and Colorado Springs, Together Since 1875. 2013. ISBN 9780989618502 OCLC 875892653
- Welsome, Eileen. Dream Delivered: The Community Health Center Movement in Denver. 2016. ISBN 9780692649442
- Welsome, Eileen. Cold War secrets a vanished professor, a suspected killer, and Hoover's FBI. 2021. ISBN 9781606354254

== See also ==
- Human experimentation in the United States
- Albert Stevens
