= Holmesburg, Philadelphia =

Neighborhood of Philadelphia, Pennsylvania, US

Holmesburg
- Neighborhood of Philadelphia
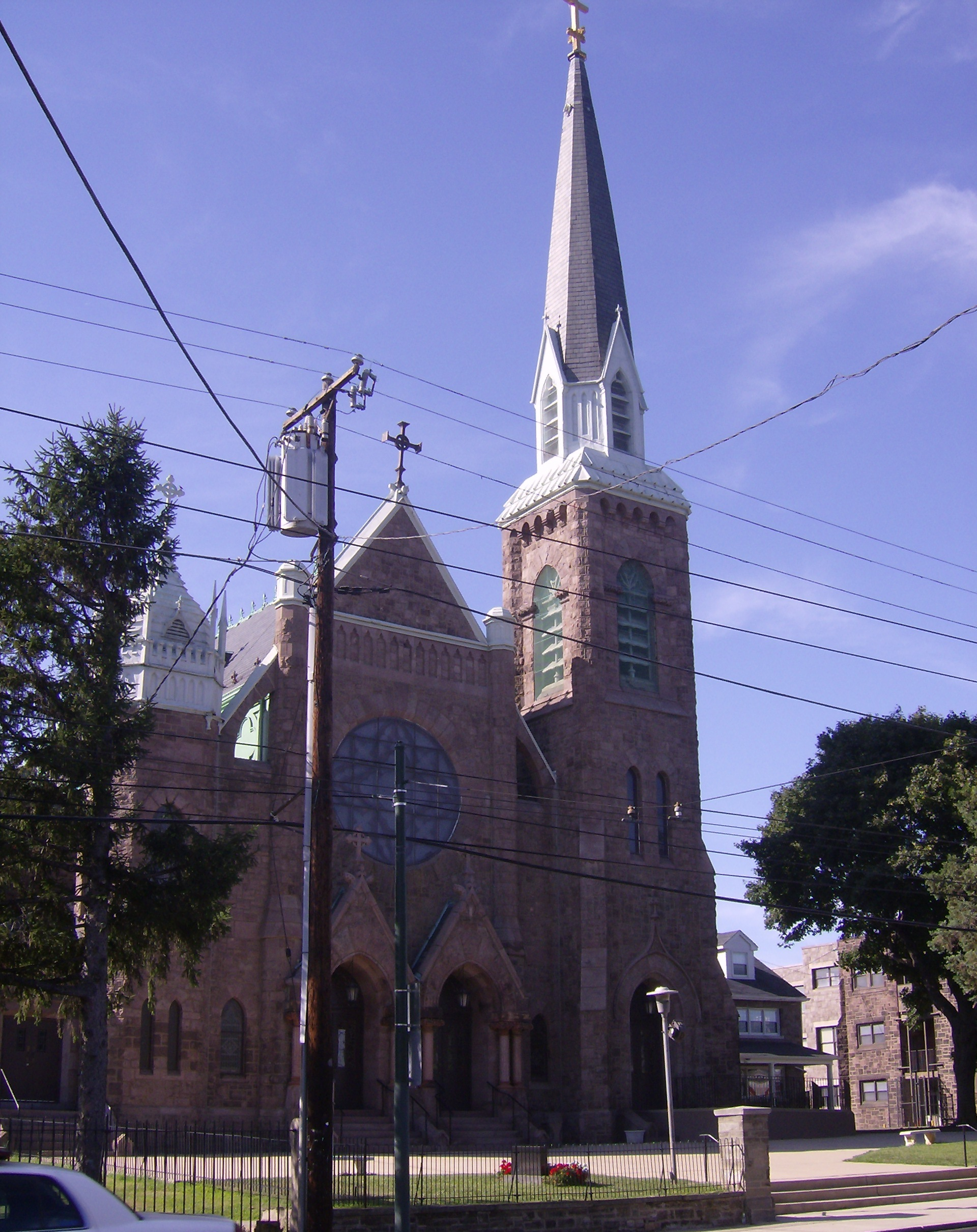
- Saint Dominic Roman Catholic Church, on Frankford Avenue, was established in 1849

- Location within Philadelphia
- Country: United States
- State: Pennsylvania
- County: Philadelphia County
- City: Philadelphia
- Area codes: 215, 267, and 445

Holmesburg is a neighborhood in the Northeast section of Philadelphia, Pennsylvania, United States. It began as a village within Lower Dublin Township, Pennsylvania, and was named in honor of Surveyor General of Pennsylvania Thomas Holme, a cartographer who devised the street plan for central Philadelphia.

The Surveyor General had no apparent business relationship or blood kinship to one John Holme, a Baptist minister and magistrate who immigrated to Philadelphia in the 1680s from New Jersey.

John Holme's descendants were land speculators and became very prominent citizens in Holmesburg, who owned a portion of the Pennypack grist mill and a lumber business, establishing an estate called Box Grove.

Holmesburg is bordered to the west by Brous Avenue to Ryan Avenue to Sandy Run/Pennypack Creek to Holme Avenue to Holme Circle to Ashton Road to Willits Road, the Delaware River to the east, and Cottman Avenue to the south. The border shared with Torresdale to the north is Welsh/Willits/Academy Road and then over to Linden Avenue. Holmesburg's ZIP code is 19136.

== History ==
The area around Holmesburg was first inhabited by the Lenape. In 1683 William Penn purchased from the natives, the land between the Pennypack and Neshaminy Creeks. In November 1682, Thomas Holme received a grant from Penn of 1,646 acres (666 ha) on either side of Pennypack Creek to establish Wellspring Plantation. In 1790, his descendants divided the land, and this 26-acre (11 ha) section became known as the Village of Holmesburg.

Penn had the King's Highway Bridge erected over the Pennypack Creek in 1697 to connect his mansion with the new city of Philadelphia. Downstream from the bridge Peter Dale and John Holme built a grist mill. A dam was constructed upstream at "Rocky Falls"; water to turn the mill-wheels was brought from the dam through a long mill-race. Welsh farmers from Gwynedd built a road to bring their grain to the mill. At the end of Welsh Road is Mill Street, which leads to where the mills once stood. When Robert Lewis came into ownership, he added a cooperage for the production of barrels and hogsheads, and this required construction of a sawmill, and probably a cider mill. A bit upstream from the sawmill, David Lewis built a textile mill which was burned during the War of 1812, but subsequently rebuilt. The mills contributed to the growth of Holmesburg.

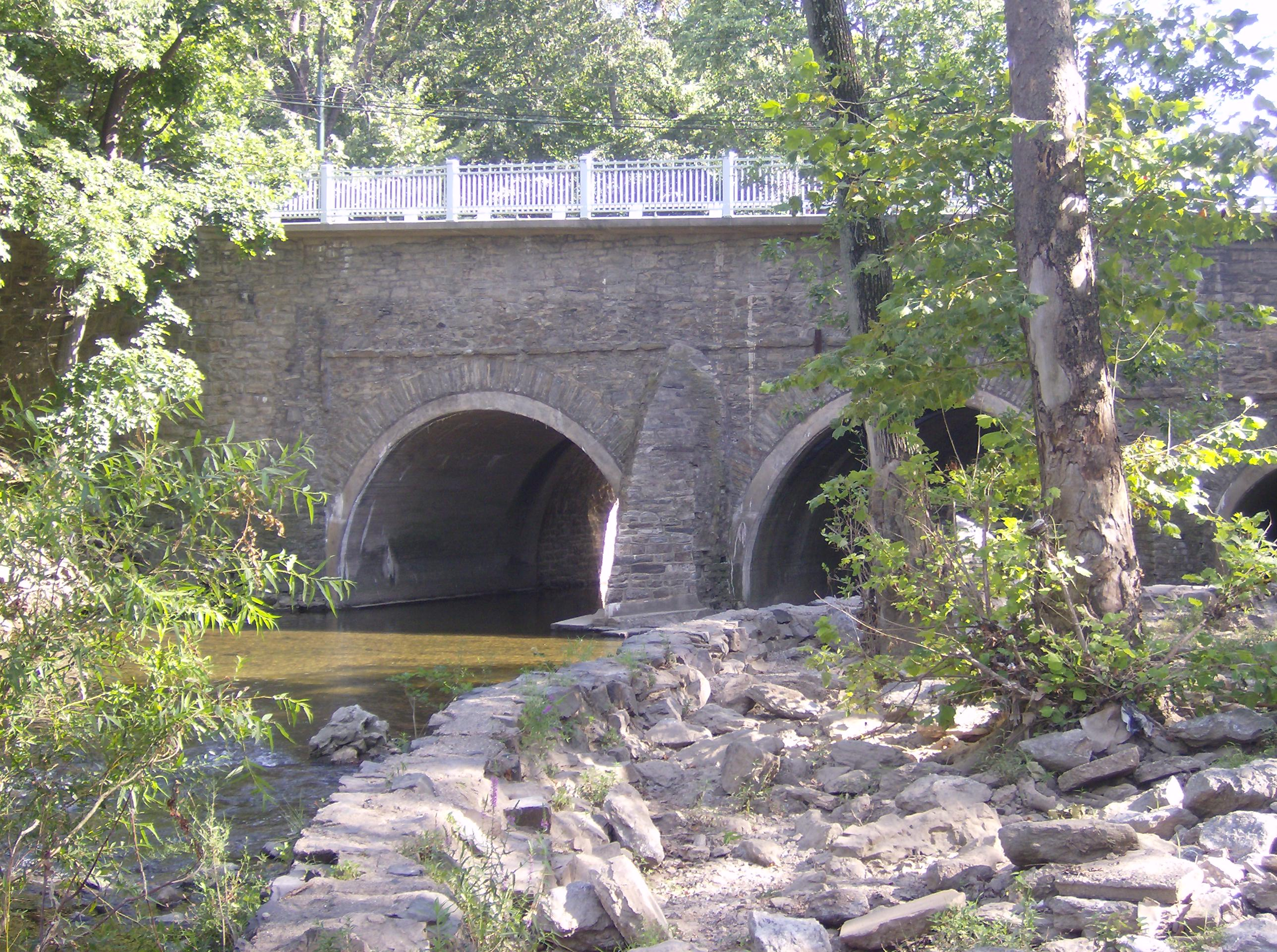
Frankford Avenue bridge over the Pennypack Creek

The first stagecoach service was established in 1756 between Philadelphia and New York. As the trip took three days, this required rest stops. A a blacksmith shop and an inn were established where Welsh Road met the King's Highway. The Green Tree opened in 1799. U.S. Route 13 between Philadelphia and Morrisville was known as the Frankford and Bristol Turnpike. Ferries had operated near the mouth of the Pennypack from early time. Ferry Lane, (now Pennypack Street) was built to access the Frankford-Bristol Road. In 1803 Holmesburg got its own toll-house and toll-gate, to cover maintenance.

In 1834, the Philadelphia and Trenton Railroad opened. By 1862, a station was established at Delaware Avenue (now Rhawn Street). In 1863, the Frankford and Holmesburg Railroad was incorporated to build a line from Frankford to Holmesburg. State Road was opened in 1870. In 1895, the Holmesburg, Tacony and Frankford Company established trolley service; and the road was renamed Frankford Avenue.

Holmesburg native George A. Castor became a successful merchant tailor with large establishments in New York City, Boston, and Philadelphia. He built the eighteen bedroom mansion "Stoneyhurst" on Solly Avenue overlooking the Pennypack Creek. As of 2018, the site was occupied by the motherhouse of the sisters of the Missionary Servants of the Most Blessed Trinity, a Roman Catholic women's congregation, that relocated there in 1931. The congregation was founded by Vincentian Father Timothy A. Judge, for whom Father Judge High School is named.

Shakespearean actor Edwin Forrest purchased 100 acres (40 ha) of land along Frankford Avenue for a country estate. After his death in 1872, his executors turned it into the Forrest Home for retired actors. It operated from about 1876 to 1927. By 1905 lands along the Pennypack had been acquired for parkland.

In 2020, former New York City Mayor and Donald Trump lawyer Rudy Giuliani held a press conference at the Four Seasons Total Landscaping parking lot, which is located in the area.

=== Act of Consolidation ===
Around 1701, Lower Dublin Township was established. In 1853, about half the area of the township was separated out into Delaware Township, which comprised Torresdale and Holmesburg. It was superseded the following year by the 1854 Act of Consolidation, 1854 and incorporated into Philadelphia.

== Thomas Holme Library ==
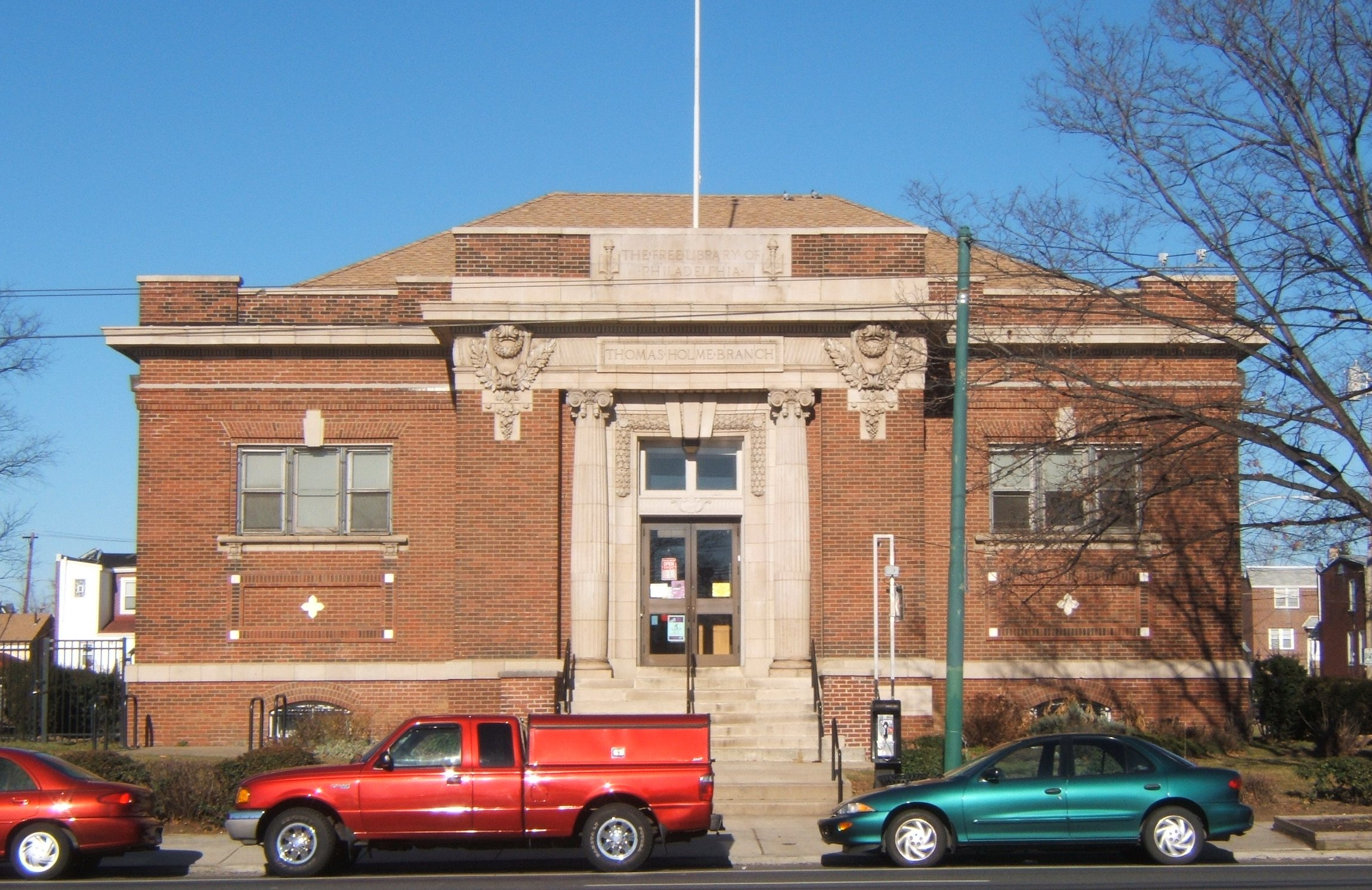
Thomas Holme Branch Library

Completed in 1906, the Thomas Holme Library is the smallest of the Philadelphia branch libraries. It was built through an endowment from industrialist Andrew Carnegie. The funds for construction were contingent on the municipality providing the land. The lot was donated by the local Lower Dublin Academy through an endowment established by the Holme family for educational purposes. While originally providing for a school, a library was considered by the trustees and the community to be a significant educational contribution, a concept shared by the Carnegie Corporation. The Thomas Holme Branch was designed by architect Horace W. Castor, of the firm of Sterns & Castor, in the Beaux Arts style. The Free Library of Philadelphia operates the Holmesburg Branch.

== Notable people ==
- George Castor, congressman
- John Gibbon, US Army general
- Pony Sager, ballplayer

== Education ==
The School District of Philadelphia operates Joseph H. Brown Elementary School in Holmesburg. The original Joseph H Brown Elementary School opened in 1895. Brown feeds into Meehan Middle School. All persons assigned to Meehan are zoned to Abraham Lincoln High School. Lincoln was originally scheduled to be named Mayfair High School, but opposition from other neighborhoods, including Holmesburg, meant that the school was instead named after Abraham Lincoln. In 1949 the school's cornerstone was laid.

Saint Dominic Roman Catholic church and grade school are located in Holmesburg. Father Judge High School is also located in Holmesburg. It was established in 1954 by the Roman Catholic Archdiocese of Philadelphia and is run by the Oblates of St. Francis de Sales. St. Hubert High School for Girls is also in Holmesburg. Holy Family University is planning on constructing buildings at the former Liddonfield Projects site.

Other private or independent schools in Holmesburg, Philadelphia include Holmesburg Christian Academy, which is affiliated with Holmesburg Baptist Church and includes a preschool, elementary school, and middle school.

== Prisons ==
Holmesburg Prison opened in 1896. The Philadelphia Prison System is located in Holmesburg. It includes the Curran-Fromhold Correctional Facility (named for Patrick N. Curran, Warden of old Holmesburg Prison, and Robert F. Fromhold, Deputy Warden, both of whom were murdered in an attack by two inmates on May 31, 1973), the Detention Center, the Philadelphia Industrial Correctional Center, the House of Correction, Riverside Correctional Facility and The Alternative and Special Detention unit. Curran-Fromhold replaced Holmesburg Prison, which was used from 1896 until 1995. Holmesburg Prison was recently reopened. Acres of Skin: Human Experiments at Holmesburg Prison is a 1998 book by Allen Hornblum, which documents clinical non-therapeutic medical experiments on prison inmates at Holmesburg Prison from 1951 to 1974.

Holmesburg contains one of the longest continuous African-American communities in the nation, having been founded by runaway slaves prior to and during the Civil War.

Holmesburg is the location of the historic Pennypack Theatre building, built in 1929 in the Art Deco style with a 1,364-seat capacity and designed by acclaimed 20th century theater architect William Harold Lee.

The Frankford Avenue Bridge and Joseph H. Brown School were added to the National Register of Historic Places in 1988.

== Recreation and transportation ==
Recreational facilities include Holmesburg Recreation Center at Rhawn and Ditman Streets, James Ramp Memorial Playground, Pennypack Park and Pennypack on the Delaware.

Transportation to Center City Philadelphia is provided by SEPTA's Trenton Line commuter train, which affords a quick 25-minute ride into the urban center. Holmesburg is also served by SEPTA bus routes 28, 66, 70, 84, and 88, which take riders to other areas around Northeast Philadelphia and surrounding suburban areas. Interstate 95 is also an easy 10-15 minute drive into downtown, accessible either by the Cottman Avenue (PA-73) entrance to the south or Academy Road entrance to the north.

Holmesburg's main thoroughfare, Frankford Avenue (U.S. Route 13), is a historic byway in use for centuries. Frankford Avenue was used as a route from Philadelphia to points north as far back as the 17th century. The Frankford Avenue Bridge across Pennypack Creek, built in 1697, is the oldest stone arch bridge in continuous use in the country.

== Holmesburg in print and film ==
Holmesburg Prison was used for three major motion pictures, Up Close & Personal starring Robert Redford and Michelle Pfeiffer, Animal Factory starring Willem Dafoe, Mickey Rourke, and Edward Furlong, and Law Abiding Citizen starring Jamie Foxx, Gerard Butler, and Colm Meany. Parts of the movie Fallen were also filmed here.
