= Edward J. Hendrick =

Edward J. Hendrick KSG
- Born: March 23, 1910; East Orange, New Jersey, U.S.
- Died: August 12, 1987 (aged 77); Philadelphia, Pennsylvania, U.S.
- Resting place: Resurrection Cemetery, Bensalem, Pennsylvania
- Education: B.A., Woodstock College; M.A., Georgetown University
- Known for: Philadelphia Prison System
- Spouse: Rita Hendrick
- Children: 7

Edward Joseph Hendrick (March 23, 1910 - August 12, 1987) was a leader in American prison systems and public administration. From 1952 to 1972, he was Deputy Commissioner of Public Welfare for the City of Philadelphia, and simultaneously served as Superintendent of the Philadelphia Prison System. By virtue of office, he was the lead named defendant in Jackson v. Hendrick, which set important legal precedents regarding humane conditions and overcrowding in American prisons. He was previously Chief Probation Officer for the United States District Court for the Eastern District of Pennsylvania. During World War II, he served in the United States Navy as prison administrator for the 12th Naval District based in San Francisco, California.

His career was bookended by service in the Catholic Church. As a young man he entered the Jesuit formation and taught Latin at Regis High School in New York City. After retiring from government service, he became one of the most senior laypeople in the Archdiocese of Philadelphia, leading Adult Social Services - including the management of various nursing homes and shelters, and related programs. He was made a Knight of St. Gregory the Great by Pope John Paul II.

== Early life ==
Edward was the first child born to Foscola Orrimela (F.O.) Hendrick and his second wife Helen C. Hendrick (née O'Neil). Foscola was an inventor and restaurateur, serving as general manager of Childs Restaurants, which was owned by his mother's family. Foscola's first wife, Frederikke Marie Blix, had died in 1902, leaving Foscola with four children. Foscola subsequently met and married Helen C. O'Neil, who had been a cashier in one of the Childs restaurants. In addition to Edward, Foscola and Helen had three further children: Helen, Catherine, and James.

As a boy, Edward attended Xavier High School in New York City, and then proceeded into the Jesuit formation, attending Woodstock College and Georgetown University.

== Career ==
In 1940, Hendrick was appointed U.S. Probation Officer for the District of New Jersey, by the Honorable Guy Leverne Fake; the appointment was confirmed by U.S. Attorney General Robert H. Jackson. In 1943, Hendrick accepted a transfer to the Eastern District of Pennsylvania, reporting to Randolph E. Wise, Chief U.S. Probation Officer. When Wise resigned, Hendrick was appointed to succeed him. Wise and Hendrick formed a professional relationship that would span another 40 years, through the City of Philadelphia (1952–1972) and the Archdiocese of Philadelphia (1973–1984), when both men retired.

In July 1944, Hendrick was granted a leave of absence from his federal role, in order to join the United States Navy in support of World War II. During the war, he ran several Navy prisons in the Western U.S.

In 1952, Wise was appointed Philadelphia's first Commissioner of Public Welfare. Wise named Hendrick as one of his three Deputy Commissioners, with a specific focus on the city's penal system. They were part of a wave of reformers coming in under Joseph S. Clark Jr., who was the city's first Democratic mayor in 68 years. Wise and Hendrick would continue in their respective roles through the next 20 years under mayors Clark, Dilworth, and Tate.

Hendrick was recognized as a progressive and vocal advocate of prison reform efforts – mounting campaigns to end prison overcrowding, to improve staffing and training levels, and to offer inmates rehabilitation and vocational programs.

As early as 1957, Hendrick gave an interview to The Philadelphia Inquirer where he called attention to the issue of overcrowding and under-staffing in his own prison system, lobbying for the construction of a new facility "to replace the overcrowded, outdated Moyamensing Prison".

Nevertheless, the Philadelphia prison population exploded during his tenure, the city did not provide adequate funding to expand capacity or programs, and the system began to crack. On July 4, 1970, inmates at Holmesburg Prison rioted. In February 1971, five inmates filed a class action (Jackson v. Hendrick), "seeking injunctive relief from conditions of confinement alleged to violate the prisoners' constitutional and statutory rights". Over 15 years the case worked its way through the legal system, ultimately to the Pennsylvania Supreme Court.

In 1972, a frustrated Hendrick surprised new Mayor Frank Rizzo by resigning his city post and joining the Archdiocese of Philadelphia, to help lead the Catholic Social Services Administration. The move should not have been a great surprise, as his friend and boss Randolph Wise had also left the City and joined the Archdiocese, just months prior.

In 1984 at the age of 74, Hendrick retired from the Archdiocese. In 1986, Pope John Paul II made him a Knight of St. Gregory; he was invested by Cardinal John Krol. He died at his home in Philadelphia on August 12, 1987.
