= Chloracne =

Skin condition caused by exposure to certain chemical compounds

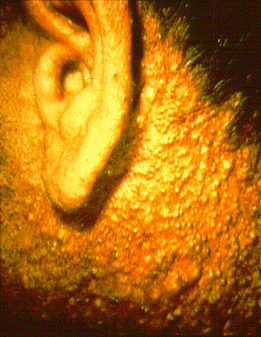
- Chloracne in this herbicide production worker involved almost every follicular orifice on his face and neck with comedones, papules and cystlike lesions.
- Specialty: Dermatology

Chloracne is an acneiform eruption of blackheads, cysts, and pustules associated with exposure to certain halogenated aromatic compounds, such as chlorinated dioxins and dibenzofurans. The lesions are most frequently found on the cheeks, behind the ears, in the armpits and groin region.

The condition was first described in German industrial workers in 1897 by Siegfried Bettmann, and was initially believed to be caused by exposure to chlorine (hence the name "chloracne"). It was only in the mid-1950s that chloracne was associated with aromatic hydrocarbons. The substances that may cause chloracne are now collectively known as chloracnegens.

Chloracne is particularly linked to toxic exposure to dioxins (byproducts of many chemical processes, including the manufacture of herbicides such as Agent Orange)—so much so that it is considered a clinical sign of dioxin exposure. The severity and onset of chloracne may follow a typical asymptotic dose-response relationship curve.

== Cause ==
Chloracne normally results from direct skin contact with chloracnegens, although ingestion and inhalation are also possible causative routes.

Chloracnegens are fat-soluble, meaning they persist in the body fat for a very long period following exposure. Chloracne is a chronic inflammatory condition that results from this persistence, in combination with the toxin's chemical properties. It is believed, at least from rodent models, that the toxin activates a series of receptors promoting macrophage proliferation, inducing neutrophilia and leading to a generalised inflammatory response in the skin. This process may also be augmented by induction of excess tumor necrosis factor in the blood serum.

The inflammatory processes lead to the formation of keratinous plugs in skin pores, forming yellowish cysts and dark pustules. The associated pus is usually a color of green approximating that of a tennis ball. The skin lesions occur mainly in the face, but in more severe cases they involve the shoulders and chest, the back, and the abdomen. In advanced cases, the lesions appear also on the arms, neck, thighs, legs, hands and feet.

In some instances, chloracne may not appear for three to four weeks after toxic exposure; however, in other cases—particularly in events of massive exposure—the symptoms may appear within days.

== Treatment ==
Once chloracne has been identified, the primary action is to remove the patient and all other individuals from the source of contamination. Further treatment is symptomatic.

Secondary infections on severe or persistent lesions may need to be treated with oral antibiotics or isotretinoin. However, chloracne itself can be highly resistant to any treatment.

The course of the disease is highly variable. In some cases the lesions may disappear within two years or so; however, in other cases the lesions may be effectively permanent (mean duration of lesions in one 1984 study was 26 years, with some workers remaining disfigured over three decades after exposure).

== Related conditions ==
Chloracne is very often seen in combination with hyperhidrosis (clammy, sweaty skin) and porphyria cutanea tarda (a skin condition of increased pigmentation, hair coarsening and blistering).

== Notable cases ==
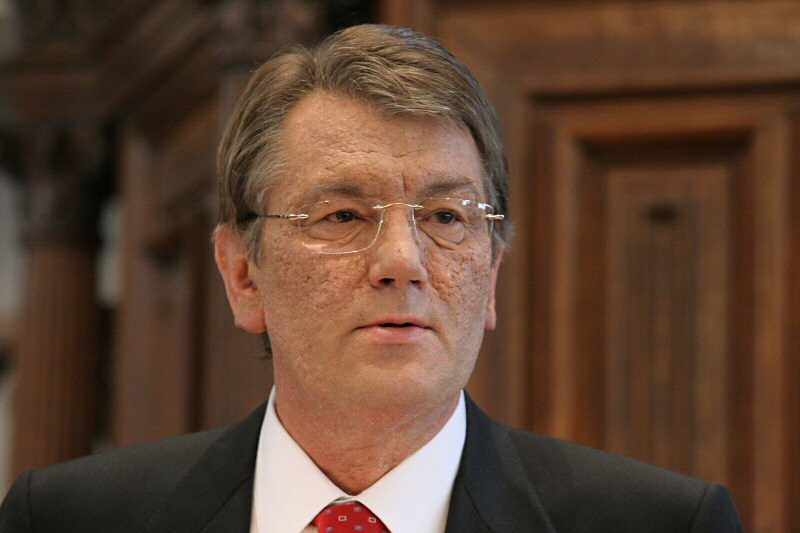
Viktor Yushchenko at the University of Amsterdam, with chloracne from TCDD dioxin poisoning (2006)

- In mid-1960s, Dow Chemical paid Dr Albert Kligman $10,000 to conduct the experiments on the toxicity effects of Dioxin (TCDD) on at least 70 prisoners at the Holmesburg Prison in Philadelphia. No records of the prisoners' identities appear to have been kept and there were no follow-up studies after the testing period. Several of the inmates developed severe cases of chloracne and some developed blisters that, untreated, lasted four to seven months.
- In 1949, 226 workers became ill after a container of herbicide exploded at a Monsanto Company plant in Nitro, West Virginia. Many were diagnosed with chloracne; a medical report at the time described "systemic intoxication in the workers involving most major organ systems."
- 193 cases of chloracne occurred in Seveso, Italy, in 1976 following an industrial accident in which up to a few kilograms of TCDD were released into the atmosphere.
- Thousands of individuals were exposed at Fort McClellan, Alabama, when a chemical weapons training center and a nearby Monsanto factory disposed of chemicals into a creek over several decades. Many individuals settled out of court, but a class-action suit is still ongoing. Although the incineration of the chemical weapons at Fort McClellan ended in 2011, areas of the base remain closed or off-limits due to the residual contamination.
- In 1968, almost 2,000 individuals in northern Kyūshū, Japan, suffered chloracne, among other symptoms, after chronic exposure to cooking oils contaminated with PCBs and PCDFs. The syndrome came to be called Yushō disease or "Rice Oil" disease.
- In 1979, a similar case of mass contamination of cooking oil was reported in central Taiwan. Over 2,000 individuals were affected by what came to be called Yu-Cheng.
- Ukrainian President Viktor Yushchenko suffered from prominent facial chloracne and was diagnosed with dioxin poisoning in late 2004.
- A Hong Kong journalist from the Stand News, Chan Yu-hong, declared in a Facebook post that he was diagnosed by a traditional Chinese medicine practitioner with chloracne after exposure to tear gas while covering the 2019 Hong Kong Protests.
