= Delaware Township, Pennsylvania =

Delaware Township is the name of some places in the U.S. state of Pennsylvania:

- Delaware Township, Juniata County, Pennsylvania
- Delaware Township, Mercer County, Pennsylvania
- Delaware Township, Northumberland County, Pennsylvania
- Delaware Township, Pike County, Pennsylvania
- Delaware Township, Philadelphia County, Pennsylvania, defunct
