= Dublin Township, Pennsylvania =

Dublin Township is the name of some places in the U.S. state of Pennsylvania:

- Dublin Township, Fulton County, Pennsylvania
- Dublin Township, Huntingdon County, Pennsylvania

== See also ==
- Lower Dublin Township, Pennsylvania, defunct, part of the defunct Dublin Township in Philadelphia County
- Upper Dublin Township, Pennsylvania
