= Pony Sager =

American baseball player (1848–1928)

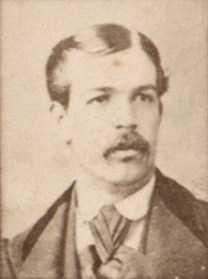
- Shortstop / Outfielder
- Born: August 12, 1848; Holmesburg, Pennsylvania
- Died: October 15, 1928 (aged 80); Newport, New Hampshire

Major league debut
- May 6, 1871, for the Rockford Forest Citys

Last major league appearance
- May 30, 1871, for the Rockford Forest Citys

Major league statistics
- Games played: 8
- Batting average: .282
- Runs batted in: 5
- Stats at Baseball Reference

Teams
- Rockford Forest Citys (1871)

Samuel B. "Pony" Sager (August 12, 1848 – October 15, 1928) was a professional baseball player. He played for one month in 1871 for the Rockford Forest Citys of the National Association.

From May 6 to May 30, Sager played in eight games for the club, four in left field and four at shortstop. He was a below-average fielder at both positions, but did show speed and a strong bat. He went 11-for-39 (.282) with five runs batted in, five stolen bases, and nine runs scored. He left the team in June after suffering a minor injury.

He was long thought to have been born in Marshalltown, Iowa, as he had played for the Marshalltown club alongside Cap Anson and had been signed by Rockford from that team. Later research found that he was a ringer brought in to play for Marshalltown, and a native of Holmesburg, Pennsylvania.
