= Carman Theatre =

Coordinates: 39.9183°N 75.2623°W

Carman Theatre was the name of two theatres in Philadelphia, Pennsylvania located on Germantown Avenue in the Nicetown–Tioga neighborhood. The first Carman Theatre opened in 1920 and operated under that name until 1927 when it was renamed the Galard Theatre. In 1929 the Galard Theatre closed and was converted into the Carman Roller Skating Rink (CRSR). The CRSR, later known as the Carman Gardens Roller Skating Rink, was in continuous operation until closing in 2019 after being purchased by Drexel University's Lenfest Center for Cultural Partnerships in 2018. In April 2026 a project to transform the building into the Carman Gardens Health Center commenced.

The second Carman Theatre was built in 1927 and opened on New Year's Day 1928. It was located directly across the street from the first Carman Theatre. It operated as a cinema and vaudeville theatre until 1950 when it ceased vaudeville entertainments. It continued to offer occasional live performances of other types along with film screenings until 1952 when it was transformed into a venue for American burlesque. It was a burlesque theatre until 1957 when it was closed following a raid by the police. It afterwards was used as a space to store motor vehicles until it was demolished in 1978.

== History ==
=== First Carman Theatre (aka Galard Theatre and Carman Roller Skating Rink) ===
The first Carman Theatre was a silent film cinema in Philadelphia that opened on November 25, 1920. It was built by entertainment entrepreneur William C. Carman. It was designed by architect William Harold Lee and was located on Germantown Avenue just above Allegheny Avenue at the intersection with Hilton Street. Its address was 3226 Germantown Avenue, and it had a seating capacity of nearly 1500 people. It was managed by George T. Gravenstein.

Carman decided to build a larger and better theatre directly across the street from the first theatre, and at this time the original Carman Theatre was renamed the Galard Theatre after one of W. C. Carman's relatives. This name change was already in place when the theatre temporarily closed to honor motion picture pioneer Marcus Loew at the time of his death in September 1927. The theatre was still active as late as March 1929 when it was screening Broadway Fever. It closed soon after during the Spring of 1929, and was converted into a roller skating rink. The theatre had an organ to accompany silent films; and the organ was later used by the rink.

Some sources have reported that the Carman Roller Skating Rink, later known as Carman Gardens, opened in 1932. However, the November 16, 1929 issue of Billboard magazine contradicts this dating with a report of a popular new skating rink in Philadelphia, Carman Rink, opened by Jesse and Malcolm Carey that was already drawing large crowds of customers. The Philadelphia Inquirer reported that the Carman Rink was located on Germantown Avenue just north of Allegheny Avenue when covering a December 1930 amateur roller skating competition held at the rink. This rink did have an opening of sorts in September 1932; with published advertisements in 1932 announcing a re-opening after a new floor had been installed in a renovation of the rink. The skating floor was 12,000 square feet and made of pine.

The Careys, founders of the Carman Roller Skating Rink (CRRS), were father and son. Jesse Carey was a world record holding roller skating champion who was originally from Scranton, Pennsylvania. His son Malcolm Carey was also a roller skating champion.. Malcolm grew up in Reading, Pennsylvania, but by 1921 was living in Philadelphia. Malcom Carey owned several roller skating rinks in Philadelphia and Reading at the time of his death in 1955.

African-American businessman Roger Lloyd purchased the CRRS in 1979. The rink became a celebrated black-owned business during his long tenure operating the rink. Lloyd started "gospel roller skating" at the CRRS in 1983. By September 1992 advertisements for the rink were calling the facility Carman Gardens Roller Skating Rink. In 2018 the rink was purchased by Drexel University's Lenfest Center for Cultural Partnerships along with other adjacent properties. It continued to operate as a roller skating rink until it was closed in 2019.

In April 2026 a ceremony was held dedicating the beginning of a project to transform the building into the Carman Gardens Health Center which was described as a "22,000-square-foot community health hub" for the uninsured.

=== Second Carman Theatre ===
1927 sketch of the Carman Theatre designed by architect W. Ellis Groben.

The second Carman Theatre (CT) was also built by William C. Carman, and was located directly across the street from the first Carman Theatre. It's address was 3221 Germantown Avenue. It was built in 1927, and was designed by architect W. Ellis Groben.

Groben incorporated tiles originally made for the Tunisian exhibit at the 1926 Sesquicentennial Exposition into its design; having purchased the entire Tunisian Building (TB) made for that event. The theatre also incorporated all of the expensive marble from the TB, and according to theatre historian Irving R. Glazer it was the "most elegant of all the theatres built in North Philadelphia".

The CT opened on January 1, 1928. The theatre was initially highly successful; drawing large crowds while employing an in-house 25 piece orchestra and offering live entertainment with top tier entertainers that performed in conjunction with screenings of movies. The CT was one of the few theaters in Philadelphia that continued to offer vaudeville entertainments in conjunction with film screenings after 1932; a practice it continued until 1950 long after the death of vaudeville elsewhere.

After 1950 the CT continued to offer occasional live stage shows along with films until as late as 1952. It was then transformed into a venue for American burlesque. From 1952 to 1957 it featured risqué stage shows that made the theatre the target of neighborhood protests by various organizations. A 1957 "morals raid" of the CT by the Philadelphia Police led to its permanent closure as a theatre. It was later used as storage space for motor vehicles.

In early 1978 pipes froze and burst in the ceiling at the CT which led to a week of pouring water in the building causing a large amount of damage. It was demolished later that year.
