= Penypack Theatre =

Former movie theater in Pennsylvania, US

Coordinates: 40.0419°N 75.0261°W

The Penypack Theatre is an historic, Art Deco-style movie house that is located on the 8000 block of Frankford Avenue of Holmesburg in the northeast section of Philadelphia, Pennsylvania, United States.

== History and architectural features ==
Built in 1929 and designed by architect William Harold Lee, this theater was designed with a 1,364-seat capacity. Among its features is a sizable stage house at its back which suggests it was likely designed both for motion picture presentations as well as live performances. Originally called the "Holme Theatre," it was renamed in honor of nearby Pennypack Park in 1946.

Built at the start of the Great Depression, it appears the theater was never used to its full potential. Operating through the Depression years as a movie theater, it was never upgraded to be competitive with newer theaters built after the Depression ended.

Sometime during the late 1950s, it was shut down as a theater and then briefly used as an auction house. When this alternative use failed, it became a carpet outlet for many years, and finally a furniture and appliance store, before being boarded up completely soon at the start of the twenty-first century. Currently the building houses a Pizza Hut/Wing Street and a Dollar Tree store.
