= Victoria Theatre (Shamokin, Pennsylvania) =

- Formerly listed on the U.S. National Register of Historic Places
- Location within Pennsylvania Location within the United States
- Location: 46 West Independence Street, Shamokin, Pennsylvania
- Coordinates: 40°47′27.63″N 76°33′26.56″W
- Area: 0.3 acres (0.12 ha)
- Built: 1917-1918
- Architect: Lee, William Harold (1884-1971)
- Architectural style: Beaux Arts
- NRHP reference No.: 85002907

Significant dates
- Added to NRHP: 1985
- Removed from NRHP: May 18, 2004

Victoria Theatre was a historic theatre located in the main commercial district of Independence Street at Shamokin, Northumberland County, Pennsylvania. It was designed by noted theater architect William Harold Lee (1884-1971), and built in 1917–1918. It was located on a trapezoidal lot at 46 West Independence Street, four stories in front and in the Beaux-Arts style of architecture. The interior featured elaborately ornamented plaster ceilings and a central dome with a suspended chandelier. It was demolished after the Rite Aid drug store chain acquired the lot in 1998.

It was added to the National Register of Historic Places in 1985 and unfortunately was delisted in 2004.
