= Landis Theatre–Mori Brothers Building =

- U.S. National Register of Historic Places
- New Jersey Register of Historic Places
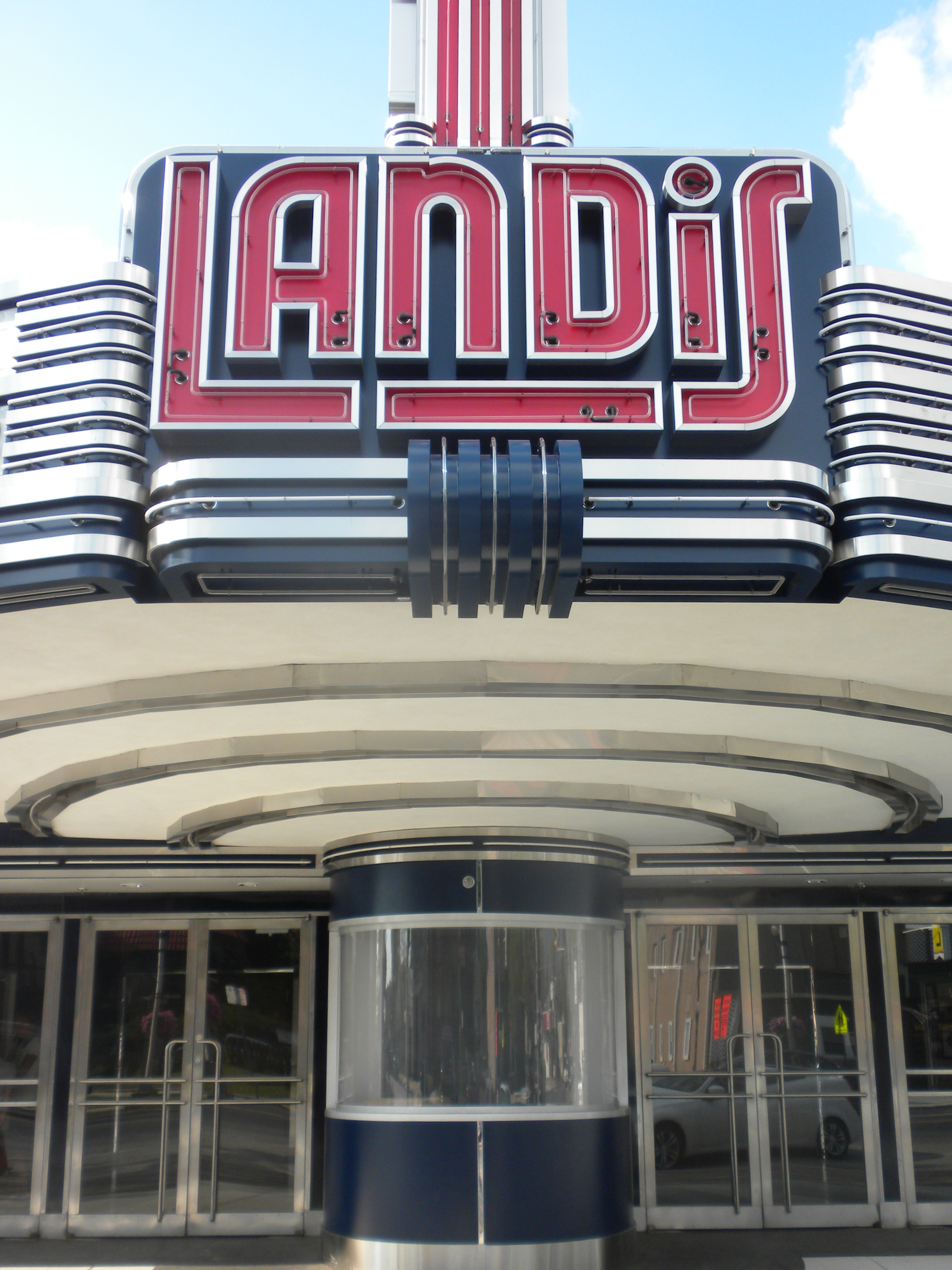

- Location within Cumberland County, New Jersey Location within New Jersey Location within the United States
- Location: 830–834 Landis Avenue; Vineland, New Jersey
- Coordinates: 39°29′10″N 75°1′3″W
- Built: 1937
- Architect: William Harold Lee
- Architectural style: Streamline Moderne
- NRHP reference No.: 00001405
- NJRHP No.: 3701

Significant dates
- Added to NRHP: November 22, 2000
- Designated NJRHP: October 12, 2000

The Landis Theatre–Mori Brothers Building is located at 830–834 Landis Avenue in the city of Vineland in Cumberland County, New Jersey. The building was built in 1937 and its first movie was Hats Off. The theater serviced the USO during World War II, and the auditorium was twinned in 1980. After 50 years of service to the Vineland community, it closed finally in 1987, victim of declining revenue against the Demarco Cinemas nearby. Its last movie was House 2. It was added to the National Register of Historic Places on November 22, 2000, for its significance in architecture, engineering, and entertainment/recreation. It was designed by Philadelphia architect William Harold Lee, who designed several historic theaters. Renovation of the theater was completed in early 2010, and it officially re-opened on May 22, with Bernadette Peters being the opening act.

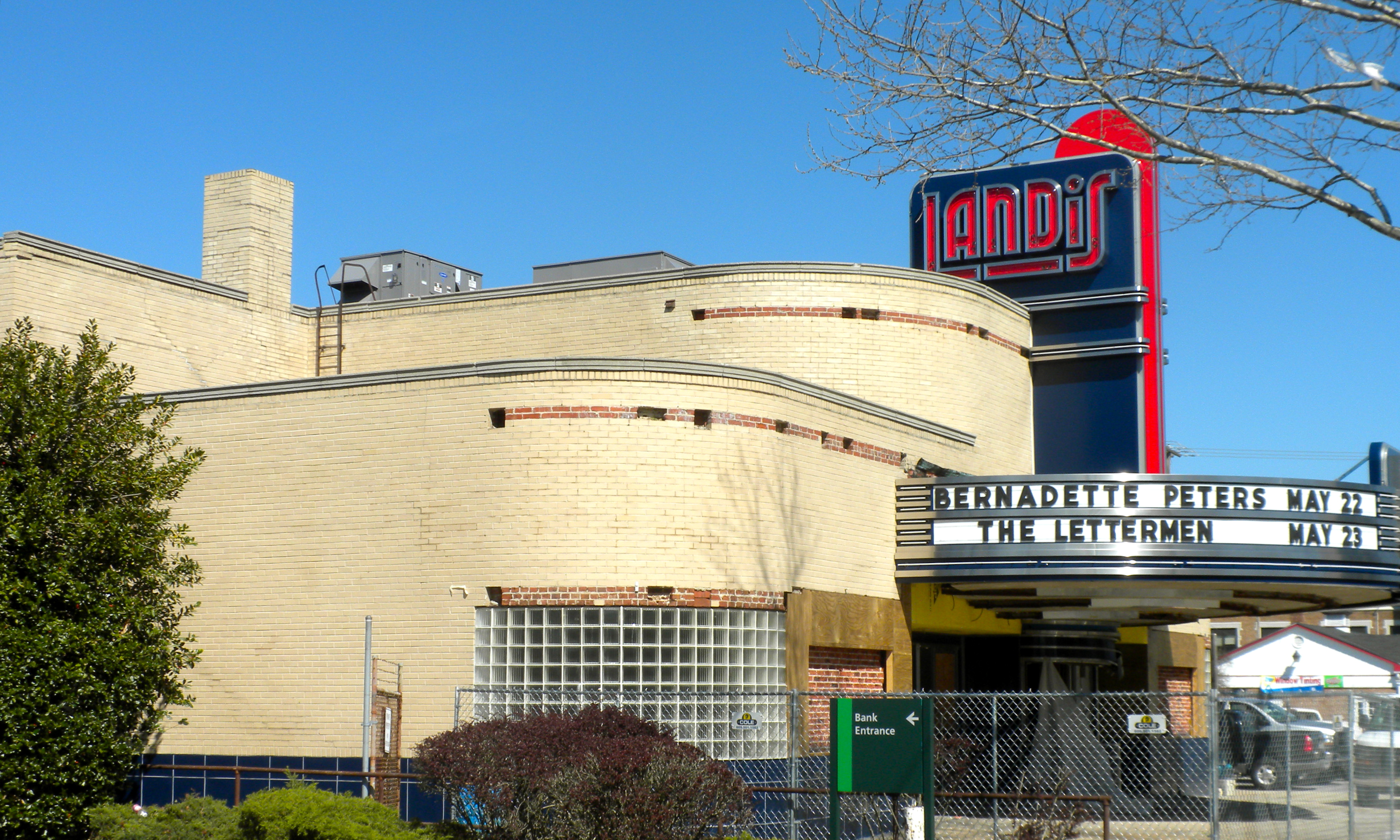
Theater under renovation in April 2010

== See also ==
- National Register of Historic Places listings in Cumberland County, New Jersey
