= James Fulton (dermatologist) =

American dermatologist

Dr. James E. Fulton Jr., M.D., (February 25, 1940 – July 4, 2013) was an American dermatologist and medical researcher who co-invented Retin-A, a popular acne medication, in 1969.

Fulton co-developed tretinoin, known by the brand name as Retin-A, with Dr. Albert Kligman. Fulton was also pioneer for his use of new procedures and treatments in dermatology. He is believed to be the first dermatologist to include an aesthetician on the staff of his medical team. His inclusion of an aesthetician was initially criticized by other dermatologists, but soon earned acceptance and is now widely practiced in the field. Fulton also championed the early use of fat transfer for breast augmentation and surgical procedures to alleviate acne scars.

== Biography ==
=== Early life ===
Fulton was born on February 25, 1940, in Ottumwa, Iowa, but raised in California. His father was an executive with the Cracker Jack company. He was plagued by acne during his early life, which would lead to his choice of dermatology as a career. Fulton earned both his bachelor's degree and medical degree from Tulane University in New Orleans, where he was a collegiate swimmer as an undergraduate. Fulton earned a Ph.D. In biochemistry from the University of Miami.

=== Career ===
In 1969, Fulton, Dr. Albert Kligman and Dr. Gerd Plewig released their study, "The Effect of Chocolate on Acne Vulgaris," through the Journal of the American Medical Association. The study followed sixty-five participants, who suffered from moderate acne, who were given two types of candy bars to eat. One group of participants were given candy bars containing no chocolate. The second group were given bars containing more chocolate than the average candy bar at the time. The trio concluded that chocolate consumption did not contribute to acne, although the study was funded by the Chocolate Manufacturers Association.

Fulton and his wife and business partner, Sara Fulton, a chemist, established Vivant Skin Care in 1990 in California. The company was relocated to South Florida in 2000. Their line of Vivant Skin Care products, which are manufactured at a facility in Miami Lakes, Florida, uses Vitamin A therapies which were patented by Fulton. Their daughter, Kelly Fulton-Kendrick, served as CEO of Vivant, as of 2013.

Fulton released a 2001 book, Acne Rx: What Acne Really Is And How To Eliminate Its Devastating Effects, in which he detailed he experience as both a researcher and a patient. In the book, Dr. Fulton called acne "complicated, mysterious and devious disease, the treatment is remarkably simple and control is finally possible." The book earned him appearances on the talk show circuit, including ABC's The View.

=== Personal life ===
Fulton died of colon cancer on July 4, 2013 at Mercy Hospital in Miami, Florida, at the age of 73. A resident of Key Biscayne, Florida, he was survived by his wife, Sara Fulton, and their four children, Kelly Fulton-Kendrick, Susan Fulton-Arregui, James E. Fulton III, and George J. Fulton.

Fulton had met his wife Sara while he was a researcher at the University of Pennsylvania and was working as an anatomy teacher in Penn's nursing department. Sara first saw Fulton in an elevator and faked a rash to obtain an appointment with him. They married during lunch on February 2, 1970, and then returned to their labs after the ceremony to continue their research for the rest of the day.

Fulton and his wife raised four children in Newport Beach, California. They continued to own a home in Newport Beach from 1975 to 2004.
