= Thomas Holme =

Thomas Holme (1624–1695) was the first surveyor general of the colonial-era Province of Pennsylvania. He laid out the first and original plan for the city of Philadelphia. Holme was a member of the Valiant Sixty, a group of early leaders and activists in the Religious Society of Friends, known as the Quakers.

== Early life ==
Holme was born in Lancashire, England, on November 3, 1624, to a yeoman, George Holme, and his wife Alice (née Whiteside). He married Sarah Croft in 1649.

== Career ==
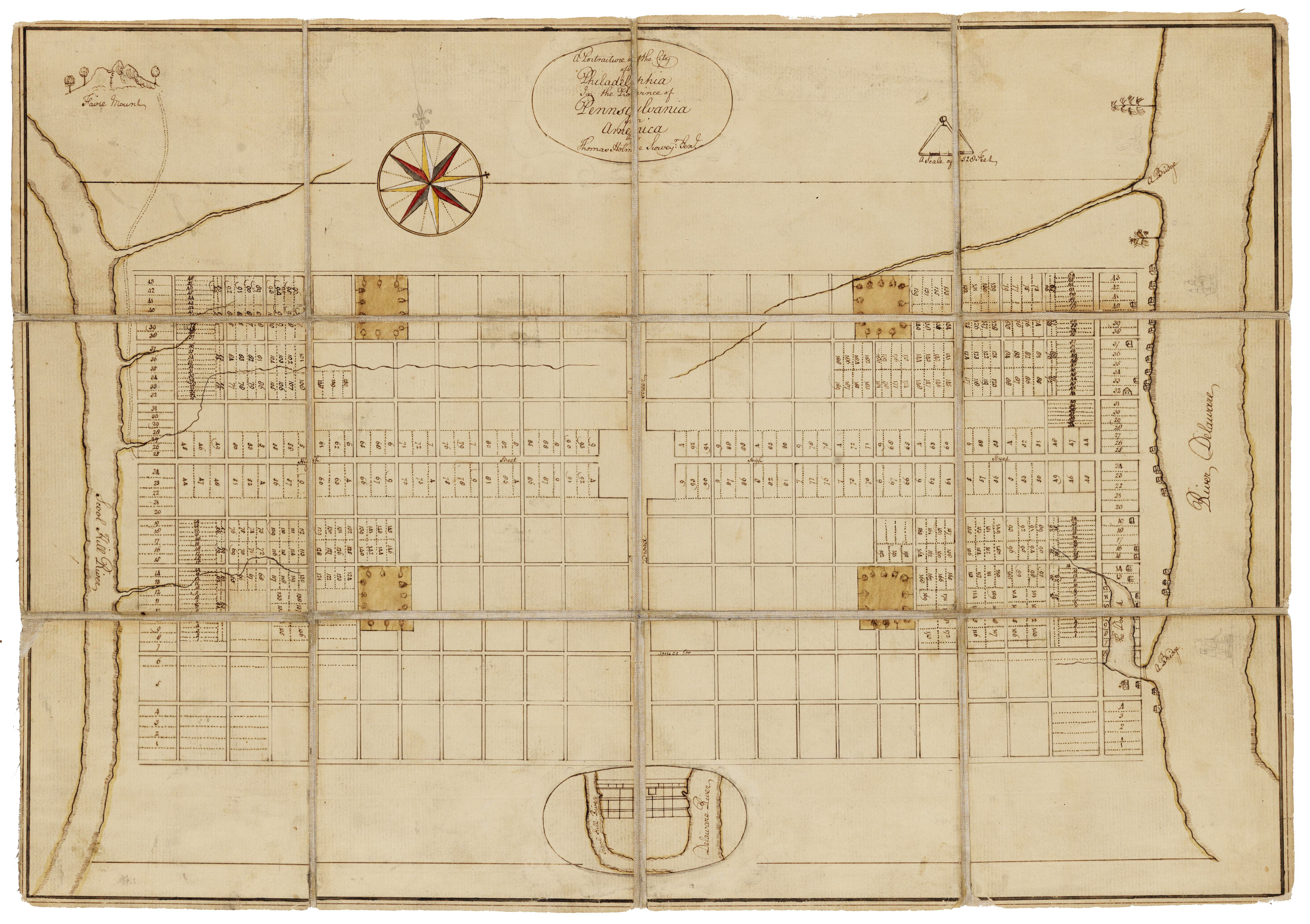
Holme's 1682 city plan for Philadelphia

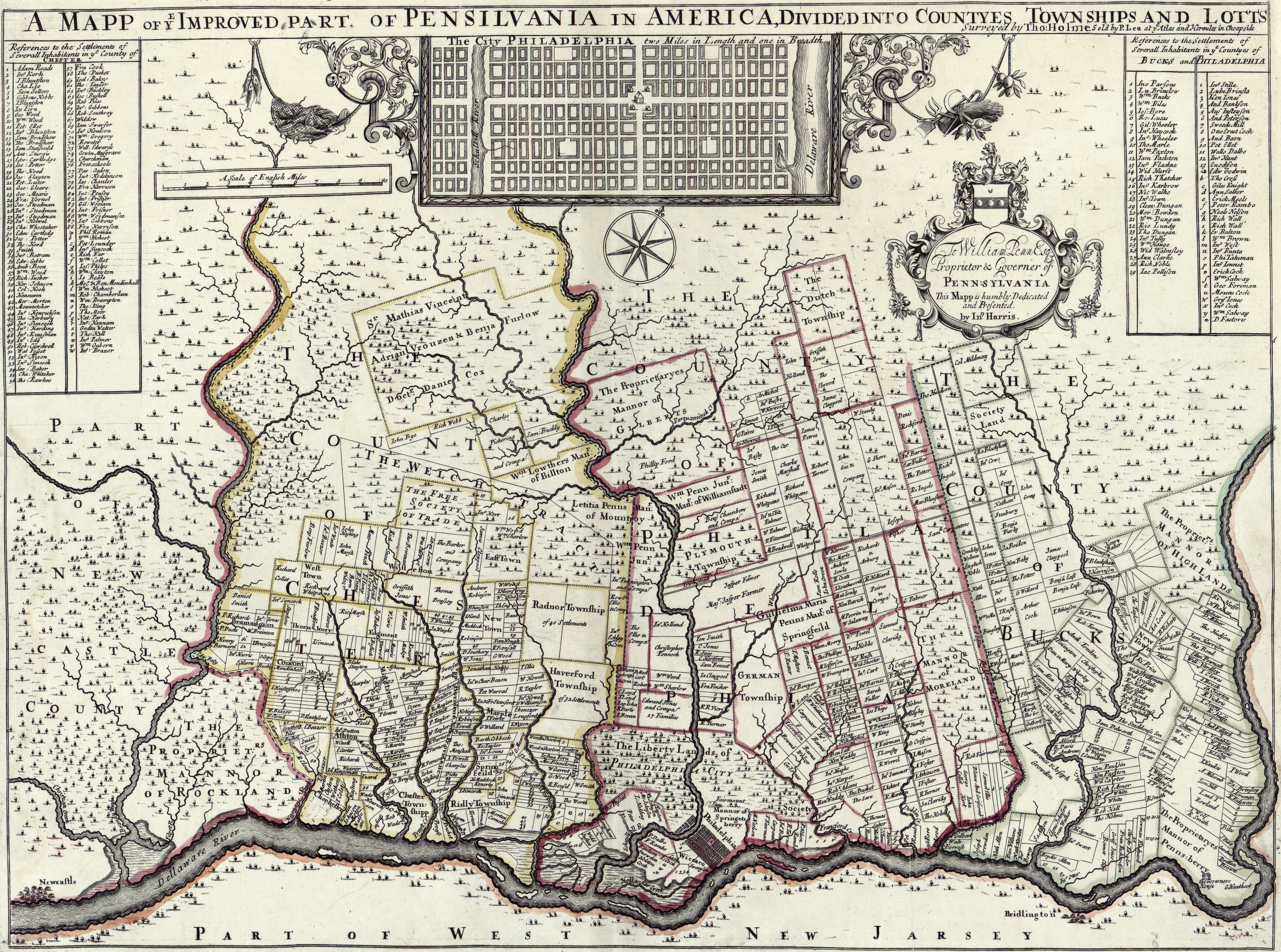
Holme's map of the colonial-era Province of Pennsylvania, published c. 1687

Soon after his marriage, Holme enlisted in the British Army, which was then under the leadership of Oliver Cromwell, where he attained the rank of captain. It may have been in the army that he gained some experience in surveying.

He was reportedly converted to the Quaker movement by George Fox, founder of the sect. There, he met fellow Quaker William Penn, founder of colonial-era Pennsylvania. In 1682, Penn wrote to Holme from the colony asking him to come be his surveyor, since his original surveyor, Captain William Crispin, had recently become ill and died on the voyage to America. Shortly thereafter, Holme, a widower, sailed with four of his children to America, where he arrived in August 1682.

Holme designed the plan of the city of Philadelphia and produced the first detailed map of Pennsylvania, titled A Mapp of Ye Improved Part of Pensilvania in America, Divided Into Countyes, Townships and Lotts...., published circa 1687. Once Penn arrived in present-day Pennsylvania, he appointed Holme one of his councilors. Holme also served as a justice of the peace and commissioner of property.

Holme held the office of Surveyor-General until his death at age 71 in the spring of 1695, in Dublin Township, Pennsylvania in the present-day Holmesburg section of Philadelphia.

After retiring, he was granted more than 4,000 acres (16 km²) in County Wexford, Ireland, which was then under the control and colonization of England.

In 1863, a memorial was erected at his burial site, in the form of a six-foot-tall marble obelisk, near where his home is believed to have been located, which is now part of Pennypack Park.

== Legacy ==
Philadelphia's Holme Avenue, Holme Circle, Thomas Holme Elementary School, and Holmesburg, a Philadelphia neighborhood, are all named in his honor.

== See also ==
- Nicholas Scull II
- Numbered streets
- Pennsylvania Town
