= Philadelphia House of Correction =

Coordinates: 40.0308°N 75.0180°W

- Interactive map of Philadelphia House of Correction
- Location: Philadelphia, Pennsylvania
- Status: Open
- Security class: Level 2
- Capacity: 1,250
- Opened: 1927
- Managed by: Philadelphia Prison System
- Website: Official website

The Philadelphia House of Correction is one of five local prisons operated by the Philadelphia Prison System. It is located at 8001 State Road in the Holmesburg neighborhood of Northeast Philadelphia.

The facility was built in 1874 and rebuilt in 1927. Originally it was designed to the same pattern as the now-disused Eastern State Penitentiary, but the reconstruction and modifications over the decades has produced many differences. Both facilities were outfitted with cells along a number of hallways radiating from a central hub. The cells were designed for single-occupancy in accordance with the Pennsylvania System.

Although the facility can hold 1,250 prisoners in 666 cells, this prison was emptied of inmates in 2019 and Mayor Jim Kenney plans to officially close the facility in 2020.

Given its age, the jail is the subject of political discussion concerning its future or replacement. The facility lacks modern fire-control systems and air conditioning.
