= Lansdowne Theatre =

- U.S. National Register of Historic Places
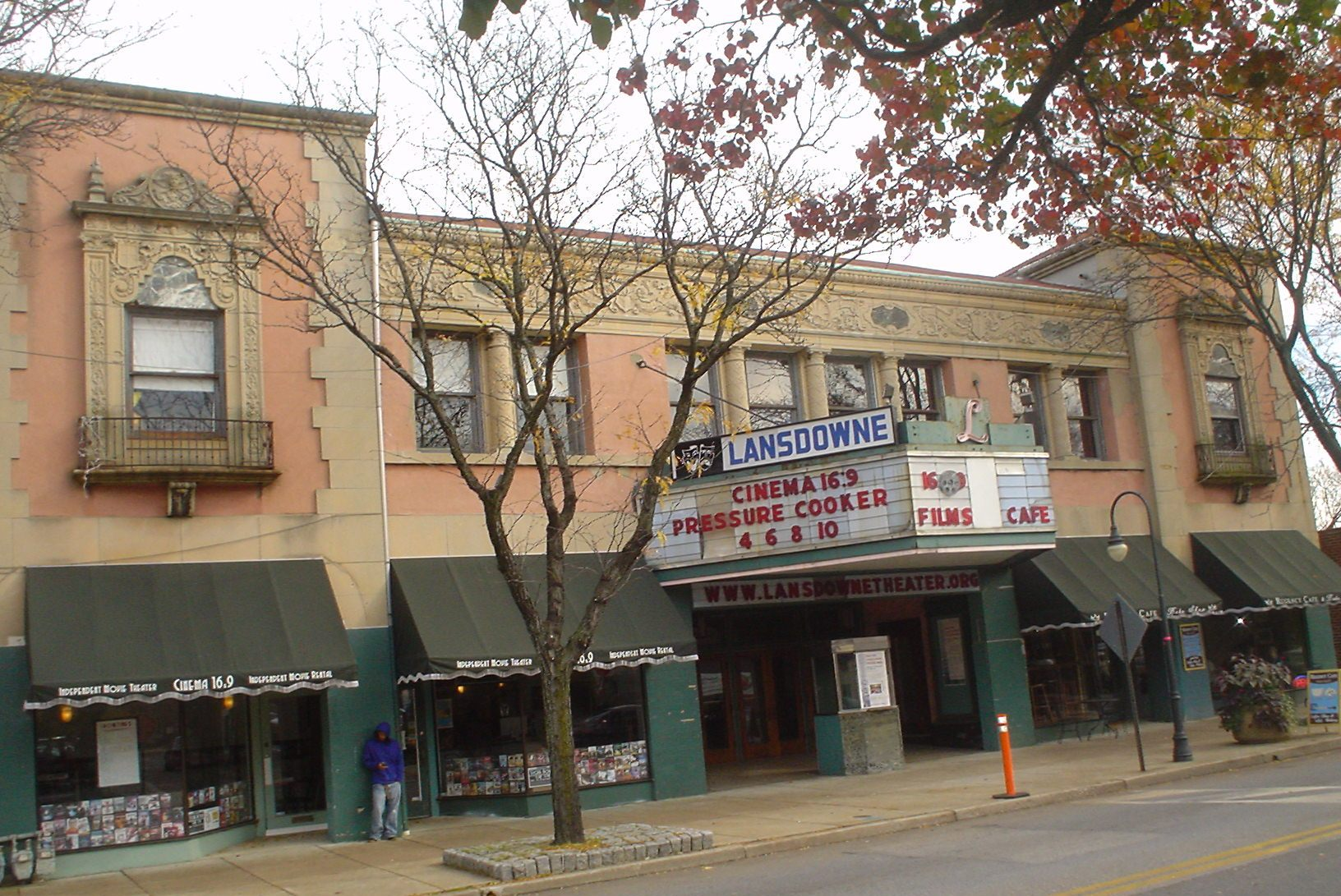
- Lansdowne Theatre, November 2009

- Location within Pennsylvania Location within the United States
- Location: 29 N. Lansdowne Ave., Lansdowne, Pennsylvania
- Coordinates: 39°56′20″N 75°16′20″W
- Area: 0.7 acres (0.28 ha)
- Built: 1927
- Architect: Lee, William H.
- Architectural style: Mission/spanish Revival
- NRHP reference No.: 86003575
- Added to NRHP: January 6, 1987

The Lansdowne Theatre is an historic theatre building in Lansdowne, Delaware County, Pennsylvania, United States.

It was added to the National Register of Historic Places in 1986.

== History and architectural features ==
Built in 1927, this historic structure consists of a two-story front section with street level shops and offices above, and a 1,400-seat auditorium. It was designed by noted theater architect William Harold Lee (1884-1971) and was created in the Spanish Revival style.

=== In popular culture ===
Len Cella showed his Moron Movies on the second floor of the theater during the early 1980s. In 1987, it was used as the set for Mad Ron’s Prevues from Hell, a collection of 1960’s to 1970’s “Slasher Horror” trailers on Netflix.

The exterior of the theater was featured in the film Silver Linings Playbook

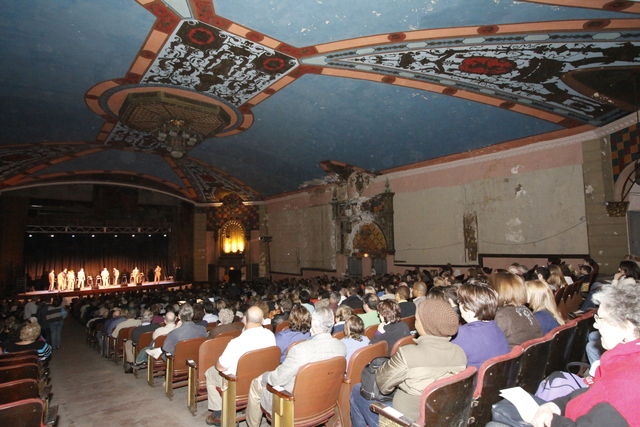
Interior, 2010

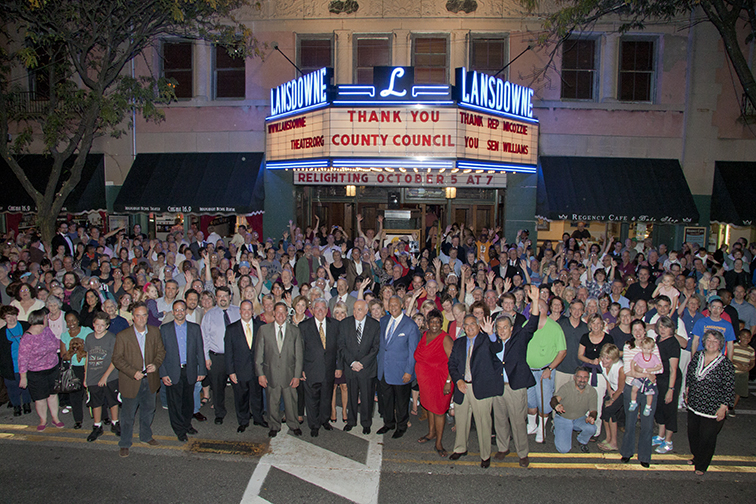
Relighting ceremony for the Lansdowne Theater marquee, October 5, 2013
