= Allen M. Hornblum =

American author

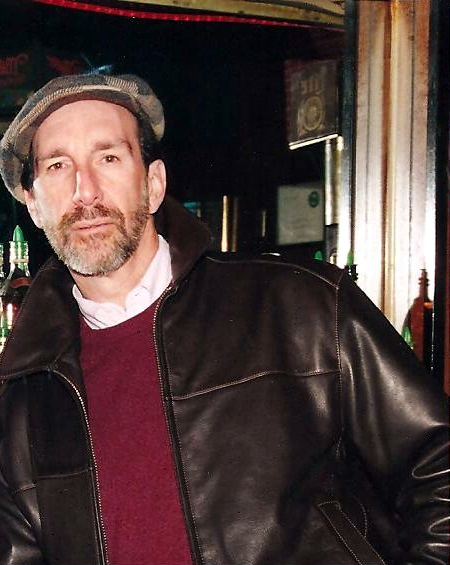
- Education: Penn State University; Villanova University; Temple University
- Occupation: Author
- Writing career
- Language: English
- Genres: Non-fiction, history, bioethics
- Notable works: Acres of Skin; The Invisible Harry Gold; American Colossus
- Website: www.allenhornblum.com

Allen M. Hornblum is an author, journalist, former criminal justice official, and political organizer based in Philadelphia, U.S. He has written eight non-fiction books ranging from organized crime and Soviet espionage to medical ethics and sports. His first book, Acres of Skin, published in 1998, detailed unethical human medical experiments at Holmesburg Prison. The publication of Acres of Skin attracted considerable international media interest. Subsequently, Hornblum wrote Sentenced to Science, a book about the experience of an African American inmate in Holmesburg prison.

Hornblum's third book on medical ethics, Against Their Will, co-authored with Judith Newman and Gregory Dober, was released in 2013. Hornblum's latest book publication is American Colossus: Big Bill Tilden and the Creation of Modern Tennis (University of Nebraska Press, Spring, 2018).

== Education ==
Hornblum graduated Penn State University and earned graduate degrees from Villanova and Temple Universities

== Career ==
After completing his master's degree from Villanova University, Hornblum went to Holmesburg prison to direct an adult literacy program in 1971. There, he noticed scores of inmates with arms covered in gauze pads and adhesive tape. He later learned that medical experiments had been conducted on the inmates for the last 20 years. Hornblum spent 10 years as a literacy instructor and sat on the board of the Pennsylvania Prison Society. He was appointed to the Philadelphia Board of Prison Trustees in 1986. While serving as a prison trustee, he actively participated in a proposal to allow prisoners the right to have condoms. However, the proposal was voted down, requiring Mayor Wilson Goode to declare the policy himself. Hornblum also served as the executive director of the Americans for Democratic Action. As executive director of Americans for Democratic Action, Hornblum led or participated in many issue and electoral campaigns that ran the gamut from U.S. Senate and City Council races to reproductive rights and right-to-know environmental campaigns. Hornblum was appointed to the Pennsylvania Crime Commission in 1988. Designed to investigate organized crime and public corruption in the commonwealth, Hornblum was a member when the Commission investigated the criminal connections of Pa. Attorney General Ernie Preate. That investigation eventually led to Preate's conviction and imprisonment.

In 1990, he was appointed chief of staff of the Philadelphia Sheriff's Office. Hornblum directed a number of efforts to improve and upgrade the office such as initiating a campaign to improve the dire conditions of the 7th floor cell room in City Hall. He resigned from the Sheriff's Office in 1994 to research and write a book about the history of the Holmesburg medical experiments. The book was released under the title Acres of Skin in 1998.

He has also been lecturer of history and Urban Studies at Temple University. Hornblum has lectured on his research and books at the British Medical Association, the National Institutes of Health, the Federal Bureau of Investigation, and numerous universities, including Columbia, Brown, Princeton, Penn State, and St. Joseph's.

Hornblum has continued to write and lecture on medical and prison issues. He illuminated that the University of Pennsylvania continued to honor Dr. Kligman with professorships and lectureships despite his use of institutionalized children and prisoners as test subjects.

He and Greg Dober wrote a paper on the origins of the infamous Tuskegee Syphilis Study. They proposed that former Surgeon General Thomas Parran was the inspiration behind Taliaferro Clark's idea of a non-treatment study on impoverished African American sharecroppers with syphilis in Macon County, Alabama.

Through the efforts of Hornblum and others, Penn finally issued an apology for the decades-long misuse of prisoners by famous dermatologist, Dr. Albert M. Kligman. Officials at the school said they would end all departmental honors in his name.

Shortly thereafter, he and a small coalition of committed activists pressured the City of Philadelphia to issue its own apology for allowing the imprisoned to be used as raw material for medical research. Mayor Jim Kenney issued the apology in 2022. The Inmate Justice Coalition then pressed the College of Physicians for a similar statement shortly thereafter.

The campaign continues to educate the public about this sad chapter in Philadelphia history and is currently exploring the question of reparations for the survivors of the prison experiments. Hornblum's efforts have been recognized by many in the media, both domestic and foreign, and he has been featured in numerous electronic and print articles.

== Books ==
=== Acres of Skin ===
In 1998, Hornblum published a book titled Acres of Skin: Human Experiments at Holmesburg Prison. The book documents clinical non-therapeutic medical experiments on prison inmates at Holmesburg Prison in Philadelphia from 1951 to 1974, conducted under the direction of dermatologist Albert Kligman. These abuses terminated with the scandal surrounding the Tuskegee syphilis experiment and the mind control experiments of the CIA. Hornblum is most critical of Kligman, who ran the experiments for two decades. Hornblum, along with George Holmes, also produced a documentary film about the Holmesburg Medical Research Program entitled, Acres of Skin – The Documentary.

=== Confessions of a Second Story Man ===
Confessions of a Second Story Man: Junior Kripplebauer and the K&A Gang is the second book by Hornblum. The book tells the story of the K&A Gang, an Irish crime group that was in existence from the early 1950s to the late 1970s in Philadelphia.

=== Sentenced to Science ===
Sentenced to Science: One Black Man's Story of Imprisonment in America was released in 2007. It is a personal narrative of Edward (Yusef) Anthony's time at Holmesburg. The book discusses the experiments conducted on Anthony and how the experiments affected his life afterwards.

=== The Invisible Harry Gold ===
In 2011, Hornblum released The Invisible Harry Gold: The Man Who Gave the Soviets the Atom Bomb, a book about the life of Harry Gold, an American spy in the Soviet underground. In the mid-1940s, Gold passed atomic secrets to Klaus Fuchs and then to the Soviet Union. Hornblum, in his book, addresses the attacks made upon Gold's character by Rosenberg supporters over the years. Hornblum spent eight years researching and writing the book and interviewed over 50 people as well as obtained recordings of jailhouse interviews with Gold conducted by his legal team.

The book was published by the Yale University Press and received positive reviews from the critics.

=== Against Their Will ===
While researching Acres of Skin on medical experiments on inmates at Holmesburg Prison, Hornblum came across documentation of similar experiments conducted on children and infants. He started researching such experiments in 2008. In 2013, he released Against Their Will: The Secret History of Medical Experimentation on Children in Cold War America co-authored with Judith Newman and Gregory Dober. The book provides multiple examples of medical experiments performed on developmentally delayed and physically disabled children at multiple institutions across the US. It was published by Palgrave Macmillan.

=== American Colossus ===
Bill Tilden was one of America's greatest athletes during the "Golden Age of Sports." The first American-born player to win the Wimbledon title and the world's most dominant tennis player during the first half of the 20th century, Tilden was also a prolific author – writing over two dozen fiction and non-fiction books, and hundreds of newspaper articles – as well as a performer on stage and screen. Despite his fame and many achievements, however, he was convicted late in life on a morals charge, served time in prison, and his celebrity and lifestyle were much reduced.

=== The Klondike Bake Oven Deaths ===
Hornblum's latest book concerns the gruesome murder of prison inmates who took part in a prison strike in Philadelphia in 1938. He is currently writing a screenplay detailing the cooking alive of prison strike supporters.

== Bibliography ==
- Acres of Skin: Acres of Skin: Human Experiments at Holmesburg Prison (1998) ISBN 978-0415923361
- Philadelphia's City Hall (PA) (Images of America) (2003) ISBN 978-0738513409
- Confessions of a Second Story Man: Junior Kripplebauer and the K&A Gang (2006) ISBN 978-1569804995
- Sentenced to Science: One Black Man's Story of Imprisonment in America (2007) ISBN 978-0271033365
- The Invisible Harry Gold: The Man Who Gave the Soviets the Atom Bomb (2010) ISBN 978-0300156768
- Against Their Will: The Secret History of Medical Experimentation on Children in Cold War America (2013) ISBN 978-0230341715
- American Colossus: Big Bill Tilden and the Creation of Modern Tennis (2018) ISBN 978-0803288119
