= William Crispin =

William Crispin III
- Born: October 3, 1627; Hull, Yorkshire, England
- Died: October 4, 1681 (aged 54); Died at sea
- Known for: One of five Commissioners appointed by William Penn to settle the colony of Pennsylvania

Captain William Crispin III (October 3, 1627 – October 4, 1681) born the son of William Crispin II (1602-1645) and wife Elizabeth (ne. Harrison) (1604-1645).

Crispin was one of five Commissioners appointed by William Penn for settling the colony of Pennsylvania, September 30, 1681. He had served in the army under Cromwell. Crispin was also appointed Surveyor General. William Penn appointed Crispin as the first Chief Justice in a letter dated August 18, 1681.

Crispin died at sea near Barbados on his way to Pennsylvania. He was replaced by Thomas Holme as Surveyor General.

== Family ==
Captain William Crispin married (1) Sept. 28, 1652, Rebecca Bradshaw, the daughter of Ralph Bradshaw and Rachel Penn (1609-1669), who was the sister of Admiral Sir William Penn. Penn, and the daughter of Captain Giles Penn, the grandfather of William Penn, the founder of Pennsylvania. His son Silas was born of this marriage, and from him are descended the Crispin families of Pennsylvania and New Jersey. From this union, there were 5 children.

1. William Crispin (24 Jun 1653 - c. 1660)
2. Silas Crispin (September 7, 1655 – May 31, 1711) born at Kingston upon Hull, East Riding, Yorkshire, England; died at Lower Dublin, Philadelphia, Pennsylvania. He married (1) Hester (Esther) Holme (daughter of Thomas Holme) in 1683, and married (2) Mary Shinn Stockton, widow of Thomas Shinn, 1697.
3. Rebecca Crispin, born c. 1656; married (1) Edward Blackfan August 24, 1688 in Sussex, England; married (2) Neheniah Allen 1725.
4. Ralph Crispin, c. 1657 – June 21, 1730; married (1) Anne Millner in Kinsale, County Cork, Ireland; married (2) Anna Busted 1682 in Kinsale, County Cork, Ireland. William Penn granted Ralph Crispin 500 acres of land in Pennsylvania, his portion of "his free gift" Ralph never left Ireland.
5. Rachel Crispin, born c. 1658; married Thomas Armstrong

Following the death of Rebecca Bradshaw, Capt. William Crispin married Jane Chudeleigh of Kinsdale, Ireland in 1655, and they had 7 children:

1. James (1666-1731), married between 1687 and 1698
2. Joseph died as youth
3. Benjamin (b. 1668) married between 1698 and 1702 to Alice Curline
4. Jane married to Greenland Lucomb
5. Eleanor (1674-1688). never married
6. Elizabeth (b. 1676) died prior to 1702 married between 1698 and 1698 to Hilliard.
7. Amy (1678-1699) married Daniel Johnson.

William Penn granted James, Benjamin, Jane, Eleanor, Elizabeth and Amy, "his free gift" of 3000 acres of land in Pennsylvania by deed on November 22, 1698. The same deed includes to "Jane Crispin, of Kinsale, widow of William Crispin." he gave " one half of 3000 acres. This deed is among the papers of the late Daniel Sutter of Mt.Holly, NJ
