= Against the Night (film) =

2017 American horror film

- Film poster
- Directed by: Brian Cavallaro
- Written by: Brian Cavallaro
- Produced by: Arielle Brachfeld; Brian Cavallaro
- Starring: Frank Whaley; Hannah Kleeman; Tim Torre
- Cinematography: Will Barratt
- Edited by: Kevin Armstrong
- Music by: Rob Houle
- Production company: Ball Four Productions
- Distributed by: Gravitas Ventures
- Release date: 15 September 2017 (United States)
- Running time: 85 minutes
- Country: United States
- Language: English

Against the Night (also known as Amityville Prison) is a 2017 American horror film written and directed by Brian Cavallaro. A limited theatrical release starring Hannah Kleeman, Tim Torre, and Frank Whaley, it is premised around a group of friends who start being killed one by one while shooting a ghost hunting video in Holmesburg Prison.

== Plot ==
Rachel, the sole survivor of an incident at the abandoned Holmesburg Prison, is being interviewed in the prison by Detective Ramsey. Hours earlier, during a housewarming party, Rachel's wannabe filmmaker friend, Hank, convinced Rachel and seven others to help him make a ghost hunting video at Holmesburg. After breaking into the building, the group splits up to explore it, with Rachel and her ex-boyfriend, Sean, uncovering paperwork relating to human experimentation, as well as unintelligible blueprints for structures similar to Holmesburg.

The filmmakers are stalked and picked off one by one by a figure wearing a gas mask and a Hazmat suit. Hank is convinced that the murderer is an alien, reveals that Holmesburg is a hotspot for extraterrestrial phenomena, and postulates that the prison's true purpose is to act as something akin to a landing pad for otherworldly beings visiting Earth. Hank and two others are all killed at the same time by the murderer, who binds, gags, and places gas masks on Dan and Michelle, which leads to the latter being accidentally killed by Sean.

After Rachel and Sean find and free Dan, the three discover a Methamphetamine laboratory on the prison property, where they recover Dan's cellphone. The trio call for aid and seemingly kill the masked man, only for another to appear and kill Dan. Rachel and Sean flee into the laboratory, where they find a bunch of dead drug cooks and dealers right before Sean accidentally attacks and is shot by a SWAT Team.

Detective Ramsey has doubts about Rachel's story, as he and his fellow officers have found no signs of there being anyone else in the prison besides the methamphetamine dealers, all of whom were dead before Rachel's group broke in Holmesburg. Detective Ramsey posits that Rachel and her friends all unknowingly became high on methamphetamine fumes, which led to one or more of them potentially killing each other during psychotic breaks, right before another officer radios in to inform Detective Ramsey that they have recovered all of the footage that was shot by Hank's hidden cameras, and that, "It's not what we thought." The lights then go out, and gunshots and screams ring out as a figure wearing a gas mask enters the room and slaughters Detective Ramsey. The entity then removes its mask to reveal that it is an alien right before lunging at Rachel.

== Cast ==
- Frank Whaley as Detective Ramsey
- Hannah Kleeman as Rachel
- Tim Torre as Sean
- Luke Persiani as Hank
- Josh Cahn as Dan
- Nicole Souza as Brooke
- Amy Zenone as Suzy
- Leah Holleran as Michelle
- Erik Kochenberger as Nick
- Yesenia Linares as Carrie
- Andrew Cavallaro as Gas Mask Man

== Release ==
Against the Night was given a limited theatrical release by Gravitas Ventures in select locations such as Los Angeles and New York on September 15, 2017. It was released on video on demand services on March 27, 2018.

== Reception ==
Rob Hunter of Film School Rejects had a positive response to the film, writing, "Against the Night is a fun little horror movie making due on a clearly limited budget, and while it stumbles more than a few times it's a success where it counts delivering atmosphere, scares, and creepy entertainment for genre fans." Mike Sprague of Arrow in the Head found the film repetitive and boring, and most of its characters thinly drawn and unlikeable, but admitted that its finale was at least "balls-to-the-wall" entertaining, noting, "Overall, Against the Night was a very hard film to sit through but eventually, it goes places in the third act that aren't a complete waste of time." Joe Leydon of Variety wrote, "Against the Night isn't a terribly good movie — it's mostly a patchwork of clichés, stock characters and low-voltage shocks culled from dozens of similar small-budget thrillers — but it isn't an entirely useless one, either."

Dax Ebaben of Bloody Disgusting gave the film a score of 1½ out of 5, and wrote, "Against the Night is yet another example of a film which started out with a decent concept but ended up floundering upon execution. While not the worst choice if one is simply looking for a film to pass the time, viewers will likely find it difficult to overlook the film’s shortcomings in favor of its successes." The same score was awarded by Matt Boiselle of Dread Central, who was wholly contemptuous of the film, writing, "I'd love to say that this movie offers something initially different to those who decide to check it out, but I couldn't scrub up one thing from this presentation, whether it was the completely flavorless characters, insipid plot or lack of scares – oh yeah, then there's the trembling, shaking, puke-inducing camera work that'll eventually have you placing your head down between your knees to help you gain a little balance."

Nick Schager of Film Journal International heavily criticized the film, calling it "an excruciating endurance test" that was wholly devoid of originally before concluding, "Against the Night features plenty of running around in the dark, gratuitous nudity, lame humor and murder sequences crafted with lightning-fast edits, strobe lights, shadows on the walls and spraying blood. What's missing, though, is a novel idea; the action plays like a brazen rip-off of My Bloody Valentine, Grave Encounters and countless other superior predecessors, awash in lousy performances and dim character behavior. The result is a film that would fail to pass muster as a Friday night I'm-bored-and-I-don't-want-to-leave-the-couch streaming-service viewing option; as a theatrical release, it ranks right up there with the very worst of 2017." Frank Scheck felt that the film left "no clichéd stone unturned" and further opined that its psychology was "strictly for the birds" in a review for it that he wrote for The Hollywood Reporter.

In a review written for the Los Angeles Times, Kimber Myers wrote, "Against the Night does little to distinguish its nine characters — particularly its women — other than offering that this one is the lesbian, this one is the exhibitionist, this is the final girl, etc. These nine people are indistinguishable, and we can't be bothered to care — or even notice — when they begin to die. Holmesburg Prison is real and seemingly tailor-made for a horror movie, though Cavallaro's shooting style often obscures the architecture. However, the director gives the audience a story that takes off in as many directions as the prison corridors, leaving us lost and dazed. But unlike the characters, the viewers never feel a moment of fear." Michael Gingold, writing for Rue Morgue, lambasted the film, especially its ending, which he opined was "WTF in the wrong way."

Screen Anarchy's Peter Martin had a middling response to the film, writing, "It's evident that Against the Night is a modest, low-budget affair, with distinctive ideas, intentions and twists in mind. Unfortunately, it falls flat." Starburst's Joel Harley condemned the film, succinctly stating, "There's no atmosphere, no tension and no invention, and the characters are ceaselessly annoying, even in the throes of death. As Indie filmmaking goes, there's far worse out there - and Cavallaro has sound intentions - but it's as cliché as low-budget semi-found footage cinema comes, in spite of its fundamental coherence and naturally scary setting. Against the Night is better than swallowing Tide Pods, but only just." Chris Packham of The Village Voice found the film's setting to be its only interesting aspect, and further opined that the lead character was annoying, the dialogue unlively, and the twist ending "exasperating."
