= Astor Theater (Reading, Pennsylvania) =

Historic movie theater in Reading, Pennsylvania, United States

- Formerly listed on the U.S. National Register of Historic Places
- Location within Pennsylvania Location within the United States
- Location: 730-742 Penn St., Reading, Pennsylvania
- Area: Less than one acre
- Architect: Lee, William H.
- Architectural style: Art Deco
- NRHP reference No.: 78002346

Significant dates
- Added to NRHP: January 5, 1978
- Removed from NRHP: June 5, 2000

Astor Theater was a historic movie theater located in Reading, Berks County, Pennsylvania, United States. It was designed by architect William Harold Lee in the Art Deco style, and built in 1928. The theater seated 2,478. It operated until 1975, then was demolished in 1998 to clear space for the Sovereign Center arena (since renamed the Santander Arena). Some architectural details, such as the ornate chandelier and gates, were salvaged from the Astor Theatre and recycled in the Sovereign Center.

It was listed on the National Register of Historic Places in 1978, and delisted in 2000.
