= Holmesburg Prison =

Former detention center in Pennsylvania, United States

Coordinates: 40.037123°N 75.018779°W

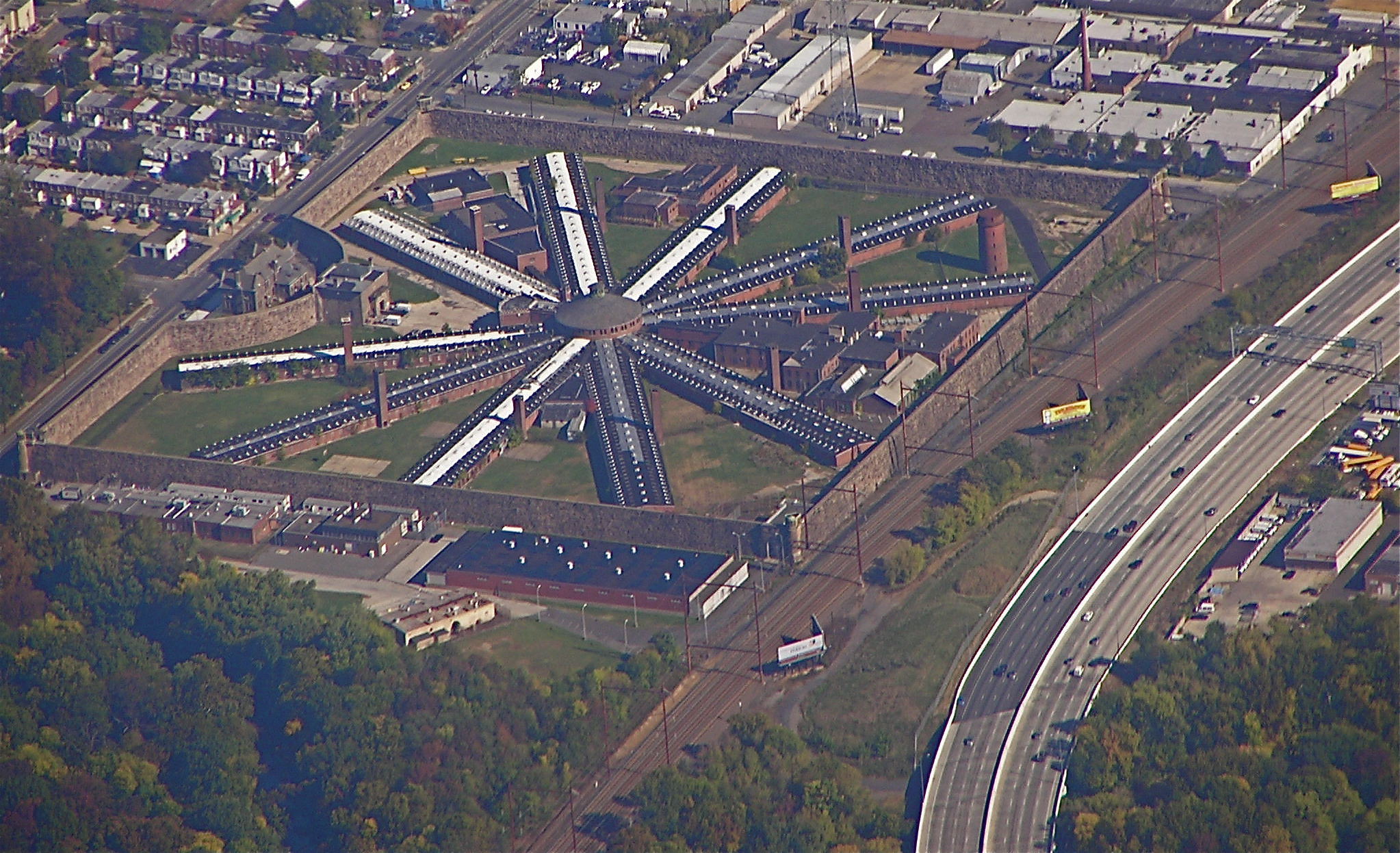
Holmesburg Prison seen from the air (2007)

Holmesburg Prison, given the nickname "The Terrordome," was a prison operated by the city of Philadelphia, Pennsylvania and the Pennsylvania Department of Prisons (PDP) from 1896 to 1995. The facility is located at 8215 Torresdale Avenue in the Holmesburg section of Philadelphia. It was decommissioned in 1995 when it closed. As of today, the structure still stands and is occasionally used for prisoner overflow and work programs.

It was the site of controversial decades-long dermatological, pharmaceutical, and biochemical weapons research projects involving testing on inmates. The experiments and research conducted on prisoners soon influenced ethical standards that are used today in modern research. The creation of the Nuremberg Code with the rule of informed consent was drafted based on this case as well as several others, like the Tuskegee experiments in Alabama. The prison is also notable for several major riots in the early 1970s as well as a report released in 1968, the results of an extensive two-year investigation by the Offices of the Philadelphia Police Commissioner and the District Attorney of Philadelphia documenting hundreds of cases of the rape of inmates. The 1998 book Acres of Skin: Human Experiments at Holmesburg Prison, by Allen M. Hornblum, documents clinical non-therapeutic medical experiments on prison inmates at Holmesburg. In 2022, the city of Philadelphia apologized for the experiments.

As of 2022, the Philadelphia Department of Prisons's Training Academy still operated near the jail.

== History ==
Holmesburg Prison was first opened in 1896 as a response to the overcrowding in Philadelphia's Moyamensing Prison. The prison's original philosophy centered around "separate penal confinement," which featured isolation tactics. However, overpopulation quickly became a problem at this prison as well and as early as 1928 riots occurred from prisoners due, in part, to overcrowding in cells.

On August 20, 1938, 23 prisoners who were on a hunger strike protesting the quality of prison food were placed into an isolation cell known as the Klondike. Due to the steam heat in the cell (where the temperature reached nearly 200 degrees Farenheit, or: 93°C), 4 prisoners died, and the ensuing "bake-oven" death investigations led to the indictment of 10 prison officials, including the superintendent and deputy warden.

The bank robber Willie Sutton, serving a life sentence, escaped from Holmesburg in 1947, with the help of other prisoners (including Frederick Tenuto, who was never recaptured), all dressed as prison guards, by climbing over the walls with ladders.

=== Albert Kligman ===
Dr. Albert Kligman was in charge of experimental research conducted on inmates. Kligman was born in Philadelphia on March 17, 1916, to Jewish immigrant parents. Kligman attended the University of Pennsylvania where he received his bachelor's degree in 1939, and three years later a Doctorate in botany at the same university. In 1947, he received his Medical Degree at the University of Pennsylvania and became a dermatologist to put his fungal studies to use. Kligman is best known for his involvement in the medical experiments on Holmesburg inmates, as well as co-inventing the acne medication Retin-A.

=== Philadelphia Moyamensing Prison ===
Moyamensing Prison was designed by Thomas Ustick Walter, where it opened October 19, 1835 to remain open for over 100 years. This was considered the prison of the city and county of Philadelphia. This institution was originally three separate facilities, with the additional structures being for females only and the "Debtor's Wing". Famous prisoners at this prison included Tom Hyer, Passmore Williamson, and H. H. Holmes. Moyamensing Prison was beginning to overcrowd in year 1896, which is the reason for Holmesburg Prison opening to relieve this issue. While Moyamensing was open until 1963, northeastern Philadelphia Holmesburg prison remained open until 1995.

=== Experiments on inmates ===
The Holmesburg Prison was the site of several scientific experiments on the inmates, which raised ethical and moral questions about the extent to which humans can be experimented on. In many cases, inmates chose to undergo several inhumane trials for the sake of small monetary rewards. The prison was viewed as a human laboratory with an inmate population as the subjects. It was an "idle collection of humanity that seemed ideal for dermatologic study," Dr. Albert Kligman famously recounted entering the Holmesburg Prison for the first time as:

All I saw before me were acres of skin. It was like a farmer seeing a fertile field for the first time."

Kligman's experimentation was extensive, exposing inmates to "herpes, staphylococcus, cosmetics, skin blistering chemicals, radioactive isotopes, psychoactive drugs, and carcinogenic compounds such as dioxins" and he received financial backing from "33 different sponsors including Johnson & Johnson, Dow Chemicals, and the U.S. Army".

One inmate described experiments involving exposure to microwave radiation, sulfuric, and carbonic acid—solutions which corroded and reduced forearm epidermis to a leather-like substance, and acids which blistered skin in the testicular areas. In addition to exposure to harmful chemical agents, patients were asked to physically exert themselves and were immediately put under the knife to remove sweat glands for examination. In more gruesome accounts, fragments of cadavers were stitched into the backs of inmates to determine if the fragments could grow back into functional organs. A former prisoner and patient recounted how: "They used my body; they did things to me that were inhuman ... I feel less than a woman because of the things they did to me. This brought me pain. A lot of pain." Such experiments did not simply affect the well-being of individual inmates, but also affected the health of entire cell blocks due to experimentation with biological agents including Hong Kong flu, poison ivy and poison oak. So common was the experimentation that in the 1,200-person prison facility, around 80 percent to 90 percent of inmates were experimented on.

The rise of testing harmful substances on human subjects first became popularized in the United States when, during World War I, President Woodrow Wilson founded the Chemical Warfare Service (CAWS) . The Armed Forces Medical Policy Council (AFMPC), for moral and ethical reasons, disagreed with the use of testing human patients, arguing that all testing must be done on volunteers who consented to the experiments. In 1959, CAWS was approved to conduct research on chemical warfare agents on human subjects. Despite gaining this approval, the issue that remained was finding consenting participants.

All inmates who were tested on in the trials had consented to the experimentation; however, they mostly agreed due to incentives like monetary compensation. Individuals like Villanova University graduate Allen M. Hornblum stumbled upon the "perfume experiments" of the University of Pennsylvania, where inmates were "renting their bodies for cash". Experiments in the prison often paid around $30 to $50 and even as much as $800. The Holmesburg prison experiments paid an extraordinary amount compared to other prison jobs. In Philadelphia's prisons at the time, inmates were able to end their sentence if they could pay for 10 percent of the set bail amount. In such a system, experiments were an easy means to earn the money for freedom.

Leodus Jones, a former inmate and one of the principals in the planned lawsuits against the Holmesburg prison wrote:

"I was in prison with a low bail. I couldn't afford the monies to pay for bail. I knew that I wasn't guilty of what I was being held for. I was being coerced to plea bargain. So, I thought, if I can get out of this, get me enough money to get a lawyer, I can beat this. That was my first thought."

Experimental research at Holmesburg Prison was run by Dr. Albert Kligman. After finishing medical school, he was interested in human fungal infections and published multiple papers on the topic. His research at Holmesburg Prison began after the prison took an interest in his work. In the 1950s, an outbreak of athlete's foot plagued the inmates, and in trying to find a treatment for the widespread problem, the prison pharmacist discovered one of Kligman's articles. The pharmacist contacted Kligman, asking him to visit the prison, a request to which he agreed. At the time, Kligman was a University of Pennsylvania Medical School professor of dermatology and was designing an experiment researching fingernail fungal infections. It was documented that the experimentation at Holmesburg prison "entailed hair transplants, implantation of foreign bodies, burns and radiation of the skin, exposure to dioxin, application and ingestion of toxic, near lethal doses of tretinoin, inoculation of Staphylococcus aureus, and the yanking out of fingernails." The prison allowed him to use prisoners as part of his research and experimentation "for a modest fee provide us with ideal opportunities."

In an interview, Kligman recounted being amazed by the prison's potential for research. The controlled conditions of the prison appealed to him, as having the inmates' diet and lifestyle standardized would minimize disruptions to his medical research. After this first visit, Kligman determined he would begin conducting his experiments at Holmesburg. "I began to go to the prison regularly, although I had no authorization. It was years before the authorities knew that I was conducting various studies on prisoner volunteers. Things were simpler then. Informed consent was unheard of. No one asked me what I was doing. It was a wonderful time." He then obtained permission to conduct the dermatological experiments from the superintendent of the prison, who agreed with Kligman that the experiments could benefit the medical realm and the prison. However, there were no formal contracts between the prison/city and the University of Pennsylvania. Perceptions of inmates and that they belong to the state reinforced the belief that practicing on people who potentially committed crimes was impartial.

==== Types of experiments ====
A range of experiments was conducted on the inmates at Holmesburg. While the experiments started with a focus on dermatological research – Kligman's speciality – experiments were also carried out to test commercial pharmaceutical products and biochemical substances. Dermatological experiments included:

- A study examining the ways a person's feet could be infected with ringworm. "Enormous quantities of fungi were administered to inmates, after which they wore boots for a week." (1957)
- A study where prisoners were infected with skin viruses, such as herpes simplex and wart virus. (1958)
- Studies exposing prisoners to long ultraviolet rays and different versions of yeasts such as candida albicans.

Biochemical experiments included a study testing dioxin, the poisonous substance in Agent Orange. The Dow Chemical Company called for these experiments and compensated Kligman with $10,000. The dosages of dioxin which inmates were exposed to were 468 times greater than those detailed in the company protocol. (1965-1966)

The United States Army contracted Kligman to test the effects of certain mind-altering drugs, with these experiments conducted in trailers on the prison grounds. Subjects from this set of experiments say they weren't aware what drugs they were given due to the lack of consent forms. The drugs produced a variety of lasting effects, such as temporary paralysis, and sudden long-term violent behavior, with half of the subjects reporting to have experienced hallucinations for days. Many prisoners stayed away from the Army experiments due to rumors that they involved LSD and resulted in participants going crazy.

Inmates who participated in the experiments received monetary compensation which varied depending on the type of study they were involved in. The pay was an attractive point to many of the inmates. One inmate named Al Zabala recalled: "I soon heard about the U of P [University of Pennsylvania] studies and the good pay they offered. They had all kinds of tests -- foot powder tests, eye drop tests, face creams, underarm deodorant, toothpaste, liquid diets, and more. It was easy money. You could make $10 to $300 a test depending on how long it lasted." In addition to acting as the subjects of experiments, inmates worked a range of roles within the experiments, for example as laboratory technicians. Zabala was one such assistant technician; he was paid $40–50 per month and was able to choose which tests he wanted to take part in.

Throughout the experiments, prisoners reported experiencing excruciating pain and frightening symptoms. One prisoner named Edward Anthony recalls signing up for a Johnson & Johnson study that was testing if a bubble bath product was harmful to someone with open wounds. He reports having developed blisters, then "fine little red bumps all over my face, arms, legs, head" with some of them "white and filled with pus". Even after quitting the test early, his back continued to feel like it "was on fire". In addition to the immediate effects of the drugs, the surviving prisoners experience a range of long-term health effects, including skin problems, cancers, and undetermined illnesses.

In the Roach v. Kligman (1976) court case, a former inmate and test subject, Jerome Roach, detailed the experiments he was subjected to while detained at Holmesburg prison. His participation was the result of needing money "to pay for minimal needs and comforts," such as soap, toothpaste, stamps, and writing materials. He recounts how he took a "temperature pill" and was told there would be no side effects. However, within four days, "Roach developed various symptoms of physical illness including sore throat, sore joints, fever, nausea, and sores and rashes" In addition to the assortment of symptoms Roach developed, he was then "improperly treated for the symptoms by the prison doctor who prescribed penicillin without knowing or inquiring if Roach was participating in an experiment." Roach also noted how he received inadequate care outside of his medical treatments, recounting how his cell had water leaking from the roof. Following the development of symptoms, the prison failed "to provide adequate facilities to screen, monitor, and treat the plaintiff to avoid serious illness." Despite Roach's claims of inadequate and negligent care, the court dismissed all claims against the defendants.

==== Chemical testing ====
Post World War I, the Geneva Convention of 1925, or the Geneva Gas Protocol, called for a ban of chemical weapons like chlorine and mustard gas. Despite advocating for it at the time, the United States continued to develop chemical agents for warfare. It has been determined that over 254 chemical compounds were tested in the Holmesburg prison facilities. Among these reagents were "acutely toxic anticholinesterase chemicals: incapacitating agents, which included the glycolates, atropine-like anticholinergic compounds of which BZ (3-quinuclidinyl benzilate) is a prototype; the indoles, represented by EA 1729 (LSD-25); the cannabinols, or marijuana-like compounds; and the sedative, or tranquilizer, group."

One of the most significant of these chemicals was 3-quinuclidinyl cyclopentylphenylglycolate (EA-3167) which was discovered when a researcher had accidentally injected himself in the thumb. The researcher immediately suffered from brain and nerve damage and the compound became of interest to the military. The military approached the University of Pennsylvania to test this compound at the Holmesburg Prison. EA-3167 was the first compound to set the precedent for the rest of the Holmesburg prison trials.

For the first batch of experiments, 19 male patients were chosen between the ages of 22 and 37 based on the results of the Minnesota Multiphase Personality Inventory (MMPI) test. These first experiments were moderate and measured standard vitals such as heart rate and blood pressure. These tests quickly radicalized and scaled up, both in terms of the number of patients and number of chemical compounds. In a study titled "Threshold Doses in Humans and Evaluations of Drugs in Man", over 320 inmates were recruited to test "ditran, atropine, scopolamine, and various experimental glycolate agents," which affected the nervous activity and the function of smooth muscles. In threshold experiments, rather than increasing dosage by small incremental amounts, experiments such as those involving EA-3167 increased in dosage often by 40 percent at a time.

In addition to providing subjects for experimentation, the Holmesburg prison also served as the perfect facility for military testing of mind-altering substances because of the presence of pliable furniture and padding as a safety precaution for patients.

Below is a list of some other significant drugs tested in the Holmesburg prison along with noted symptoms.

Drug	Symptoms
Agent 282	Grogginess and lightheadedness
Agent 834	Mental impairment and Hallucinations
CAR 302, 212	Light headedness
CAR 302, 368	Light headedness, slurred speech, and lack of drive
Agent 1-11 (Atropine Sulfate)	Dullness of consciousness, difficulty distinguishing reality from fantasy.
Agent 668	Mildly high symptoms and intoxication.

==== Radioactive testing ====
Given the climate of the Cold War, there was an increase in the interest in radioactive material in the United States. One of the main experimenters at the Holmesburg prison was Dr. Albert Kligman who applied for a By-Product Material License to the U.S. Atomic Energy Commission (AEC) to store radioactive isotopes for testing on Holmesburg prisoners. Before the Cold War the use of radioactive isotopes medically had been mostly restricted to X-ray machines which were used for diagnoses and treatment against ringworms. One of Kligman's first radioactive experimenting protocols was testing the turnover rate of the human skin in a study entitled "Studies of Human Epidermal Turnover Time Using S35 Cysteine and H3 Thymidine and of Cutaneous Permeability Using C14 Testosterone and Corticosteroid." In these studies, human skin was radioactively labelled and anywhere from 50 to 200 subjects from Holmesburg were tested on. Kligman stated that the radioactive thymidine posed no threat to the patients because it was "excised within minutes" and that radioactive materials were never consciously left within an inmate's body. The use of radioactive thymidine was eventually disapproved in 1965. These studies were overseen by the dermatology department at the University of Pennsylvania.

==== Dioxin testing ====
The testing at the Holmesburg prison was first brought to light after the release of an exposé in The Philadelphia Inquirer on January 11, 1981, "Human Guinea Pigs: Dioxin Tested at Holmesburg". In the emerging agricultural climate of the United States, pesticides were very commonplace to destroy weeds and unwanted vegetation. The Dow Chemical Company had produced herbicides such as 2,4-D and 2,4,5-T that contained impurities, specifically 2,3,7,8-Tetrachlorodibenzodioxin (TCDD). These were often sprayed in fields as pesticides even with the allegations that the compound was far too dangerous to be released in the environment. Given scientific testing linking TCDD to fetal cancers upon exposure, the Environmental Protection Agency (EPA) banned Dow Chemical from producing the chemical. Dow Chemical vehemently opposed this ban and partnered with the University of Pennsylvania and the Holmesburg prisons to prove the safety of their chemical. In the Holmesburg prison, pesticides were injected into patients to establish safety threshold dosages. In many cases, excessive doses would produce chloracne, inflammatory pustules, and papules which lasted four to seven months at a time. Throughout the experiments, over ten patients had been given over 7,500 micrograms of TCDD, which was an excessive amount, surprising even Dow Chemical's scientists. Throughout the experiments, the dosage administered had increased to 468 times the initial recommended doses.

While Dow Chemical maintained that the TCDD-tainted herbicides caused no harm to humans, the EPA argued that these herbicides posed a threat to mankind. During experimentations, 2, 3, 5-T contributed to $14 million of Dow Chemical's profits and in 1979, this number would increase to $9 billion. This is one of the first examples of company-sponsored human testing using prison populations. This approach was heavily criticized as being "inhumane" and the media often likened the experiments to Nazi genocide and the various medical experiments performed on concentration camp populations. These trials further placed the Holmesburg prison under racial allegations for primarily testing on black and non-white inmates. The EPA and the Office of Pesticide Programs (OPP) initially looked into investigating these trials, however, the investigation was soon dropped due to the cost and resources associated. Many of the inmates who reached out to the EPA for legal advice were turned away under the claim that once they had signed their consent waivers they were unable to charge the Holmesburg prison. The New York Times quickly jumped onto this story and ran an article stating: "Somewhere almost certainly in the United States, are as many as 70 men who could help researchers determine the risks of human exposure to the poison called dioxin." What was perhaps most shocking in the article was the seemingly callous attitude and lack of guilt on the part of the researchers. In the article, Kligman went so far as to say: "All those people could have leukemia now — about one chance in 20 billion. And I could be hit by an asteroid when I walk out on the street, but I don't think I will." Several patients disagreed with their treatment as "human guinea pigs" and took their grievances to court, given the lack of government support. Several lawsuits were filed in the early 1980s against Kligman, the Holmesburg Prison, and Dow Chemical. Most of these lawsuits such as those filed by Jones and Smith against the doctor, the university, the city, and Dow Chemical Company." were settled out-of-court .

==== End of prison trials ====
Many advocates of the prison trials, such as Solomon McBride, who was an administrator of the prisons, remained convinced that there was nothing wrong with the experimentation at the Holmesburg prison. McBride argued that the experiments were nothing more than strapping patches of cloth with lotion or cosmetics onto the backs of patients and argued this was a means for prisoners to earn an easy income. Furthermore, it was believed that the Holmesburg prison contributed to society such as in the development of Retin A as an acne medication. The case was made that the prisoners often wanted to participate in these tests due to the monetary reward. Inmates could earn $15 a week or even $250,000 a year depending on the sponsor and experiment, simply by wearing patches which allowed inmates an increased quality of life within the prison wards within the prison economy. Although there were proponents of the system, the testing on prisoners was eventually halted under public and legal pressure. To defend experimentation practices, Holmesburg prison began to insist upon the use of formal contracts to absolve the prison of any responsibility, however, many claimed these contracts were void due to the lack of informed consent. News stories would reflect Holmesburg in a negative light. The negative public opinion was particularly heightened by the 1973 Congressional Hearing on Human Experimentation. The hearing was supposed to discuss the Tuskegee Syphilis Study and clarify the ethical and legal implications of human experimental research. This climate called for a conscious public which rallied against the use of vulnerable populations such as prisoners as guinea pigs. Companies and organizations who associated themselves with human testing faced severe backlash. Amidst the numerous Senate hearings, public relation nightmares, and opponents to penal experimentation, county prison boards in Pennsylvania realized human experimentation was no longer acceptable to the American public. Swiftly, human testing on prisoners was phased out in the United States.

==== Holmesburg Trials and the Nuremberg Code ====
The United States had ironically been strong enforcers of the Nuremberg Code and yet had not followed the convention until the 1990s. The Nuremberg Code states:

"[T]he person involved should have legal capacity to give consent; should be so situated as to be able to exercise free power of choice, without the intervention of any element of force, fraud, deceit, duress, overreaching, or other ulterior form of constraint or coercion; and should have sufficient knowledge and comprehension of the elements of the subject matter involved as to enable him to make an understanding and enlightened decision."

The Holmesburg trials violated this definition of informed consent since inmates were unaware of the true nature and dangers of the chemicals they were subjected to during experimentation and only consented due to the monetary reward. America's shutting down of prison experimentation such as those in the Holmesburg prison signified the compliance of the Nuremberg Code of 1947.

Allen M. Hornblum described, "what happened at Holmesburg was just as gruesome as Tuskegee, but at Holmesburg it happened to smack dab in the middle of a major city, not in some backwoods in Alabama. It just goes to show how prisons are truly distinct institutions where the walls don't just serve to keep inmates in, they also serve to keep public eyes out." The Holmesburg prison trials were a prime example of profits and the promise of scientific advancements overshadowing the ethical issues associated with research.

==== Food and Drug Administration investigations ====
Kligman became a target for investigation by the Food and Drug Administration (FDA) in 1965 as his research program was so large: he was studying a high "number of new drugs" and was contracted by 33 different companies. In July 1966, the FDA banned Kligman from conducting drug testing at Holmesburg Prison, due to discrepancies in record keeping, and not following the conditions set out by the FDA for the testing of investigative drugs. However, Kligman's ability to conduct experiments was reinstated less than a month after the initial ban. Experimentation at Holmesburg Prison was forcibly ended by the prison's board of trustees after the Senate Labor and Public Welfare Committee's health subcommittee hearing on human experimentation in 1974.

==== Repercussions of the experiments ====
The Holmesburg Prison experiments conducted by Kligman led to many questions about the ethics behind using prison inmates for medical research. There were issues of informed consent since the prisoners weren't made aware of exactly what substances were being tested on them at the time.

As the public became more aware of the testing that occurred within Holmesburg Prison, ex-prisoners started realizing they had a right to sue those in charge of the experiments. In the 1980s, former prisoners who had participated in the dioxin experiments filed lawsuits against Dow Chemical. Other groups such as Johnson & Johnson, Kligman and his company, and the University of Pennsylvania faced a class-action lawsuit filed by 298 ex-prisoners in the year 2000. This lawsuit requested free medical care and financial compensation for those former prisoners and test subjects. But, in 2002, the federal court eventually ruled, that the statute of limitations had passed and dismissed the former prisoners' case.

Experiments have been run on prison inmates throughout the second half of the 20th century, similar to those run by Kligman at Holmesburg Prison. As a result of the questioning of these Kligman experiments, testing on prisoners was limited by the United States Department of Health, Education, and Welfare in 1976. Their report restricted experimentation on inmates to "non-intrusive, low-risk, individually beneficial research".

=== Closure ===
The facility was closed in 1995.

After that, until 2017, Holmesburg was often used for tactical training exercises, and the location for many of the scenes in the 1995 film Condition Red, the 1996 film Up Close & Personal, the 2000 film Animal Factory, the 2009 film Law Abiding Citizen, a 2014 episode of the paranormal reality show Ghost Stalkers, the 2017 film Against the Night, and the 2017 film Death House. Holmesburg no longer allows any visitors (citizens, film crews, photographers, historians) to have access to the building or the grounds.

== See also ==
- Human experimentation in the United States
- Acres of Skin: Human Experiments at Holmesburg Prison
- Human radiation experiments
- Eastern State Penitentiary

== Sources ==
- Hornblum, Allen M. (1998). Acres of Skin: Human Experiments at Holmesburg Prison: A True Story of Abuse and Exploitation in the Name of Medical Science. Routledge. ISBN 0415919908.
- Hornblum, Allen (2007). Sentenced to Science: One black man's story of imprisonment in America. University Park: Pennsylvania State UP. ISBN 978-0271033365.
- Reiter, Keramet (2009). "Experimentation on Prisoners: Persistent Dilemmas in Rights and Regulations" (PDF). California Law Review. 97 (2). Archived from the original (PDF) on September 8, 2015.
- Washington, Harriet (2008). Medical Apartheid: The Dark History of Medical Experimentation on Black Americans from Colonial Times to the Present. Knopf Doubleday Group. ISBN 978-0767929394.
- Hawes, Shawn - Public Information Officer, Philadelphia Department of Prisons—Opening paragraphs
- US District Court for the Eastern District of Pennsylvania. (1976, April 30). Roach v. Kligman, 412 F. supp. 521 (E.D. Pa. 1976). Justia Law. Retrieved May 6, 2022, from https://law.justia.com/cases/federal/district-courts/FSupp/412/521/2368218/
