= Acres of Skin =

1998 nonfiction book by Allen Hornblum

- Author: Allen M. Hornblum
- Subject: Experimentation on prisoners
- Genre: Non-fiction
- Publisher: Routledge
- Publication date: 1998
- ISBN: 0-415-91990-8

Acres of Skin: Human Experiments at Holmesburg Prison is a 1998 book by Allen Hornblum. The book documents clinical non-therapeutic medical experiments on prison inmates at Holmesburg Prison in Philadelphia from 1951 to 1974, conducted under the direction of dermatologist Albert Kligman. The title of the book is a reference to Kligman's reaction on seeing hundreds of prisoners when he entered the prison: "All I saw before me were acres of skin"; "It was like a farmer seeing a fertile field for the first time".

The book discusses issues surrounding the inadequate consent procedures of the 1950s and 1960s when using prisoners. Prisoners, attracted by the compensation, were angry when two of the experiment's participants testified before Congress.

The publication of Acres of Skin in 1998 attracted considerable international media interest. The book has been reviewed in several journals including the International Journal of Dermatology, Social History of Medicine and Canadian Journal of History. Mark Hilberman's review of the book in the Journal of Medical Ethics found Hornblum's assessment of the experiments to be overblown, particularly in his comparison of Kligman's use of experimental acne treatments to Nazi human experimentation.

== See also ==
- Human experimentation in the United States
- The Protest Psychosis: How Schizophrenia Became a Black Disease
- List of medical ethics cases
