= William Harold Lee =

- Born: December 9, 1884
- Died: February 3, 1971 (aged 86)

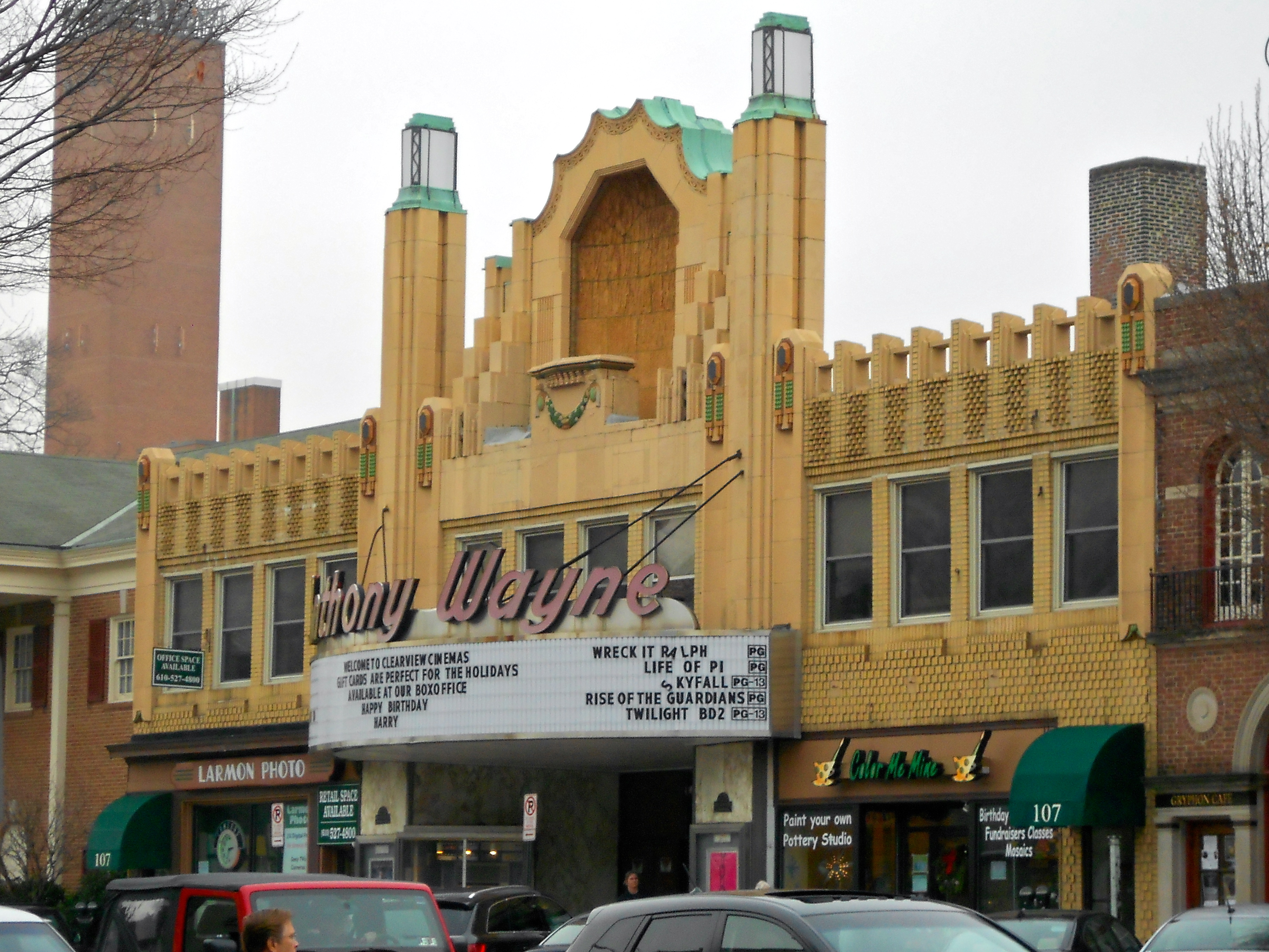
Wayne Theater

William Harold Lee (December 9, 1884 – February 3, 1971) was an American 20th century movie theater designer and later the chief architect for Eastern College. He was a protégé of acclaimed Philadelphia architect Frank Furness.

Lee attended Trinity College for a year, before transferring to the University of Pennsylvania where he studied architecture.

During his career, Lee designed numerous theaters and several buildings at Temple University, Franklin and Marshall College. Many of his theaters have only recently begun to receive critical recognition, and while some of his greatest theaters have been demolished, such as the Astor Theater in Reading, Pennsylvania and Victoria Theatre in Shamokin, Pennsylvania. In most cases those which still exist today are being restored. These include the Anthony Wayne in Wayne, Pennsylvania, the Majestic Theatre in Gettysburg, Pennsylvania, the Bryn Mawr Theatre in Bryn Mawr, Pennsylvania, the Hiway Theatre in Jenkintown, Pennsylvania, the Lansdowne Theatre in Lansdowne, Pennsylvania, and the Landis Theater in Vineland, New Jersey.

In 1920, Lee was commissioned for the renovation of the Walnut Street Theatre at 9th and Walnut Streets in Philadelphia. The Walnut, a National Historic Landmark, is the oldest theater in the United States in continuous operation. He also was the architect for the Carman Theatre which opened on Germantown Avenue in North Philadelphia in 1920.

The Royal Theatre at 1524 South Street in Philadelphia, was designed in two phases. Architect Frank E. Hahn designed the exterior in 1920, and Lee contributed the design of the interior in 1925. The two designs represent divergent styles of architecture, with Lee's French-inspired Art Deco interior at odds with Hahn's exterior. Lee frequently used the Art Deco style to modernize theaters designed in more traditional styles. Lee designed the Pennypack Theatre in Art Deco style, located on the 8000 block of Frankford Avenue of Holmesburg.

In 1928, Lee designed the Sedgwick Theater, 7133-41 Germantown Avenue in Philadelphia. Lee used Art Deco elements in combination with traditional building detailing.

== Gallery ==
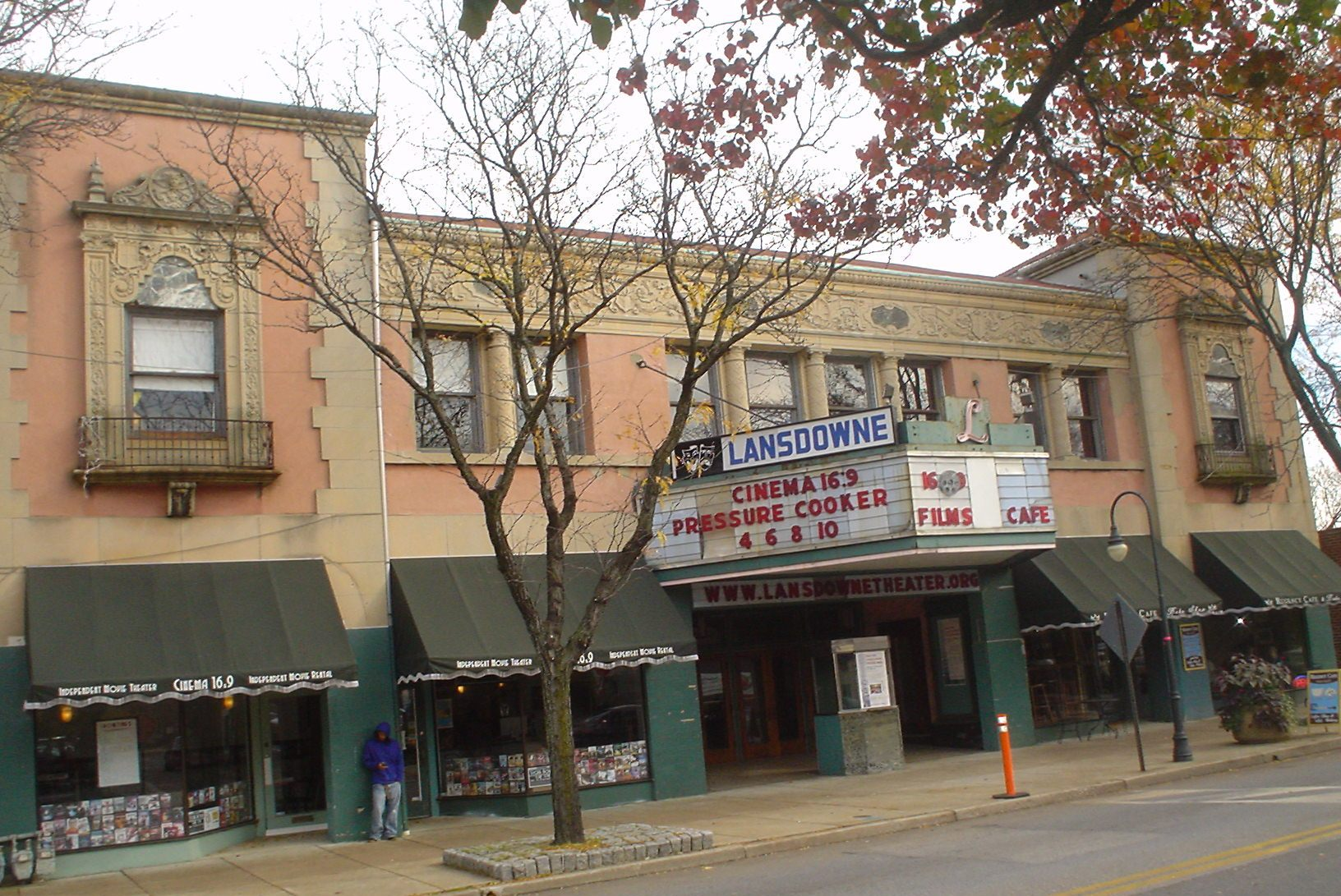
Lansdowne Theatre

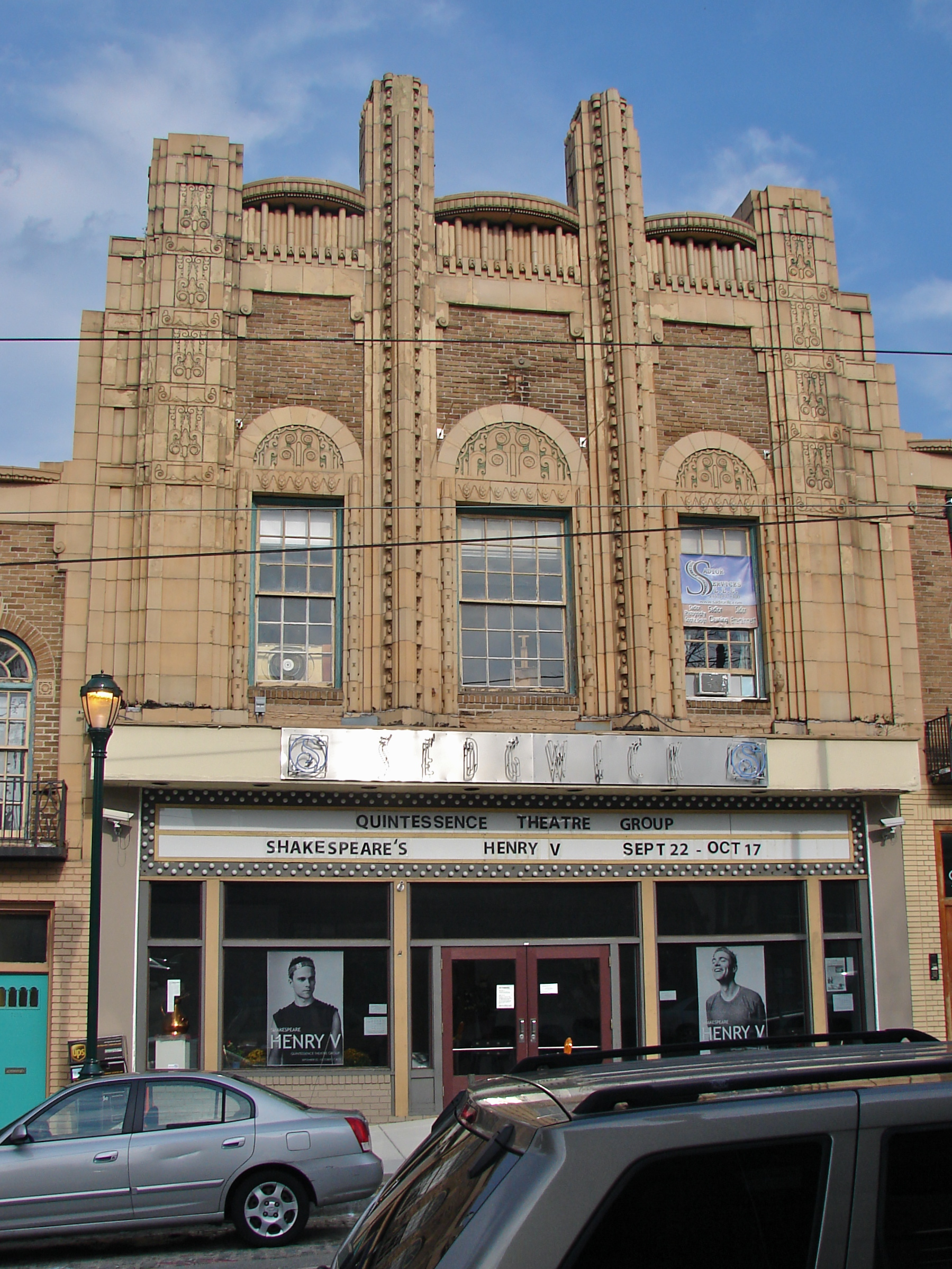
Sedgwick Theatre

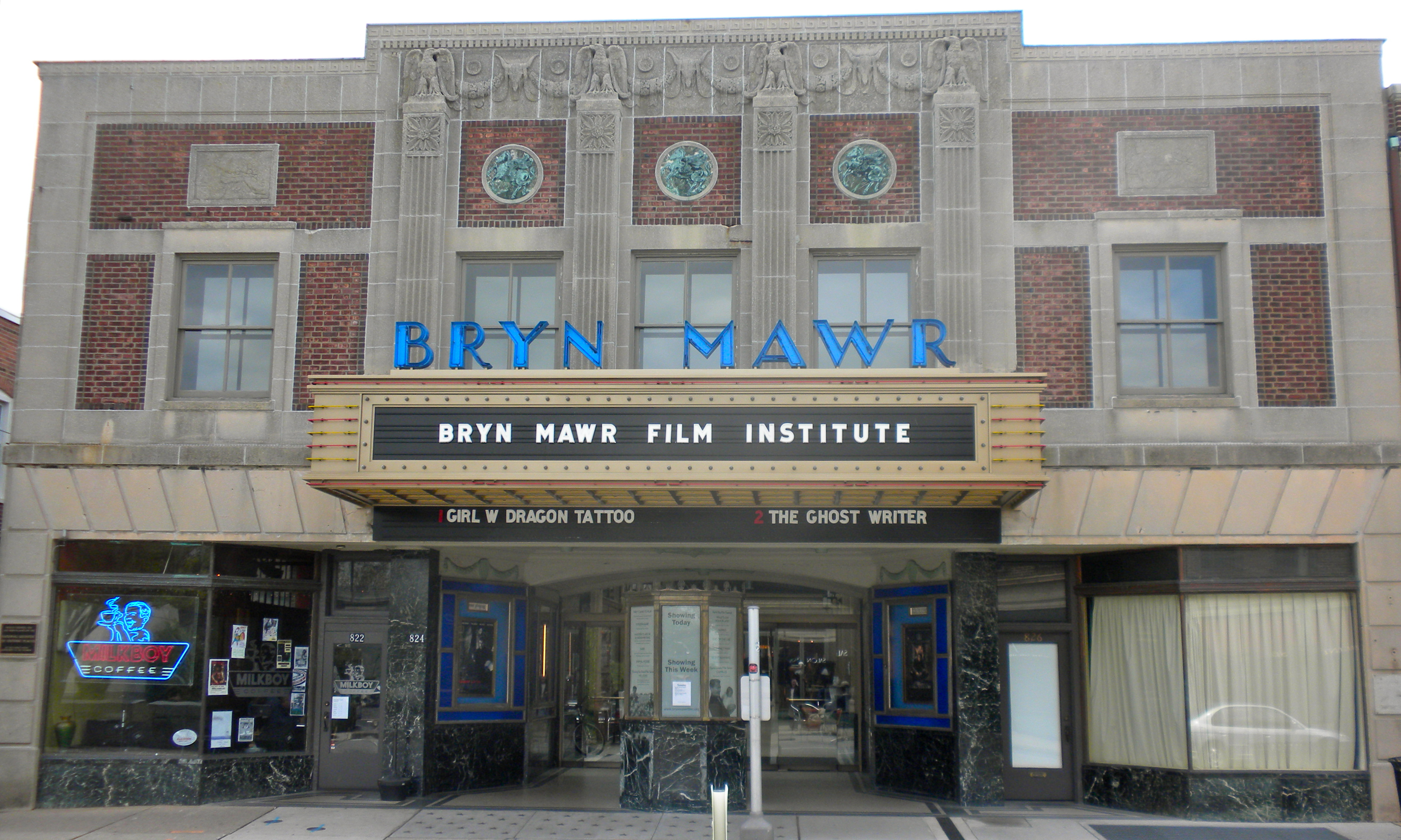
The Seville Theater, now known as the Bryn Mawr Film Institute
