= Lower Dublin Township, Pennsylvania =

Lower Dublin Township
- Former Township
- Location of Lower Dublin Township in Pennsylvania Lower Dublin Township (the United States)
- Coordinates: 40°03′47″N 74°59′42″W
- Country: United States
- State: Pennsylvania
- County: Philadelphia
- Time zone: UTC-5 (EST)
  - Summer (DST): UTC-4 (EDT)
- Area codes: 215, 267, and 445

Lower Dublin Township, also known as Dublin Township, was a township that was located in Philadelphia County, Pennsylvania, United States. The township ceased to exist and was incorporated into the City of Philadelphia following the passage of the Act of Consolidation, 1854.

== History ==
Commonly called Lower Dublin, a township in the upper part of the county, adjoining Moreland and Byberry Townships on the south, extending southeast nearly in a parallel line to the Poquessing Creek and the Delaware River. Bustleton, Fox Chase and Holmesburg were in this township.

It was originally about five miles at its greatest length and three miles in breadth, with an area of 9,500 acres (38 km^{2}). It was bisected by the Pennypack Creek, known in those days as the Dublin Creek. This township was formerly called Lower Dublin to distinguish it from another Dublin township, formerly in Philadelphia County, but now in Montgomery County, and there called Upper Dublin. This township was one of the first created in the county, but the date is not known.

In 1853, about half the area of the township was separated out into Delaware Township, which comprised what are now the Torresdale and Holmesburg sections of the city of Philadelphia.

== Resources ==
- Chronology of the Political Subdivisions of the County of Philadelphia, 1683-1854 (Daly, John; Weinberg, Allen (October 1966). Genealogy of Philadelphia County Subdivisions (Second ed.). Philadelphia Dept. of Records.)
- Information courtesy of ushistory.org
- Incorporated District, Boroughs, and Townships in the County of Philadelphia, 1854 By Rudolph J. Walther - excerpted from the book at the ushistory.org website
