= Experimentation on prisoners =

Scientific experimentation throughout history which uses prisoners as test subjects

Throughout history, prisoners have been frequent participants in scientific, medical and social human subject research. Some of the research involving prisoners has been exploitative and cruel. Many of the modern protections for human subjects evolved in response to the abuses in prisoner research. Research involving prisoners is still conducted today, but prisoners are now one of the most highly protected groups of human subjects.

== Requirements of research involving prisoners ==
According to the Common Rule (45 CFR 46), prisoners may only be included in human subjects research when the research involves no more than a minimal risk of harm.

== Prisoner consent ==
Prisoners cannot consent. Their status as imprisoned human subjects becomes even more ethically problematic when investigators offer incentives such as parole, phone calls, or objects that are normally unavailable to prisoners.

== Historical abuses ==
=== Argentina ===
In 1927, serial killer Cayetano Santos Godino, known as The Big-Eared Midget was subjected to a surgery to shrink his ears. Godino, who was convicted of murdering four children between 1906 and 1912, was serving an indefinite sentence in Ushuaia. Doctors, influenced by Italian criminologist Cesare Lombroso, thought that the root of Godino's evil was in his large ears.

=== Ancient history ===
Herophilos of Chalcedon was reputed by Celcus, among others, to have vivisected prisoners received from the Ptolemaic kings.

=== Second Sino-Japanese War and World War II ===
In Japan, Unit 731, located near Harbin (Manchukuo), experimented with prisoner vivisection, dismemberment and induced epidemics on a very large scale from 1935 to 1945 during the Second Sino-Japanese War. With the expansion of the Empire of Japan during World War II, many other units were implemented in conquered cities such as Nanking (Unit 1644), Beijing (Unit 1855), Guangzhou (Unit 8604) and Singapore (Unit 9420). After the war, Supreme Commander for the Allied Powers Douglas MacArthur gave immunity in the name of the United States to all members of the units in exchange for the results of a fraction of the conducted experiments, so that in post-war Japan, Shirō Ishii and others continued to hold honoured positions. The United States blocked Soviet access to this information. However, some unit members were judged by the Soviets during the Khabarovsk War Crime Trials. The effects were lasting and China is still working to counteract the effects of buried pathogen caches.

=== United States ===
Project MKUltra was a CIA-run human experiment program from 1953–1973 where volunteers, prisoners and unwitting subjects were administered hallucinogenic drugs in an attempt to develop incapacitating substances and chemical mind control agents, in an operation run by Sidney Gottlieb.

Numerous experiments were done on prisoners throughout the US. Many prisoners eventually filed lawsuits and these actions brought about many more investigations and suits against doctors, hospitals and pharmaceutical companies. Experiments included high-risk cancer treatments, the application of strong skin creams, new cosmetics, dioxin and high doses of LSD. Many incidents were documented in government reports, ACLU findings and various books including Acres of Skin by Allen Hornblum. The Stateville Penitentiary Malaria Study is one of many examples. The Plutonium Files, for which Eileen Welsome won a Pulitzer Prize, documents the early human tests of the toxicity of plutonium and uranium on people.

American oncologist Chester M. Southam injected HeLa cells into Ohio State Penitentiary inmates without informed consent in order to see if people could become immune to cancer.

=== Germany and German-occupied territory ===
The Herero and Nama genocide in present-day Namibia, in Southern Africa, resulted in a large number of prisoners in concentration camps. These prisoners were used as medical test subjects by German agents.

During the second World War, Nazi human experimentation occurred in Germany with particular bias towards euthanasia. At the war's conclusion, 23 Nazi doctors and scientists were tried for the murder of concentration camp inmates who were used as research subjects. Of the 23 professionals tried at Nuremberg, 15 were convicted. Seven of them were condemned to death by hanging and eight received prison sentences from 10 years to life. Eight professionals were acquitted. (Mitscherlich 1992)

The result of these proceedings was the Nuremberg Code. It includes the following guidelines, among others, for researchers:

Informed consent is essential.
Research should be based on prior animal work.
The risks should be justified by the anticipated benefits.
Research must be conducted by qualified scientists.
Physical and mental suffering must be avoided.
Research in which death or disabling injury is expected should not be conducted.

== See also ==
- Human experimentation
- Medical abuse
- Prisoner abuse
- Unit 731
