= Philadelphia Prison System =

Government department in Philadelphia, Pennsylvania

Coordinates: 40.030904°N 75.018084°W

The Philadelphia Department of Prisons is operated by the city of Philadelphia in Pennsylvania. The facilities are located on State Road in Northeast Philadelphia.

== Prisons ==
Philadelphia Department of Prisons operates four facilities:

=== Curran-Fromhold Correctional Facility ===
The Curran-Fromhold Correctional Facility (CFCF) opened in 1995 and can house up to 2,000 inmates. Currently the facility houses roughly 1420 inmates. The facility was named in honor of Warden Patrick N. Curran and Deputy Warden Robert F. Fromhold, who were murdered at Holmesburg Prison on May 31, 1973. They are the only PDP staff known to have been killed in the line of duty. CFCF consists of four housing buildings and an administration building. Each building has eight housing units with each unit consisting of 32 cells. The units are divided into two tiers. Inmates housed on each unit have access to indoor and outdoor recreation, medical triage, law library, and program areas. The food production facility has the capacity to produce 27,000 meals daily in 2000.

=== Detention Center ===
The Detention Center (DC) houses approximately 285 medium custody male inmates. The DC opened in 1963, replacing the defunct Moyamensing Prison as an intake center for the Philadelphia Department of Prisons. The Detention Center is a PDP male intake center until the intake function was transferred to CFCF in 1995. Currently, the facility houses mostly minimum-custody adult males and contains the PDP's Medical Unit. Inmates who require direct physical or behavioral health observation and supervision are located at the DC.

=== Philadelphia Industrial Correction Center ===
The Philadelphia Industrial Correction Center (PICC) opened in 1986 holds approximately 475 medium custody adult male inmates along with roughly 225 female inmates. It was the first PDP facility constructed to operate on the basis of unit management. PICC's is split into 13 housing units arranged around separate yards, laundry facilities, medical triage areas, counseling rooms, and staff offices, vocational training areas, law libraries and chapels. PICC has two housing areas designated as behavioral health transition units.

=== Riverside Correctional Facility and Dorms ===
The Riverside Correctional Facility and Dorms (RCF) opened in 2004 and can house approximately 350 female inmates as well as 99 community custody male inmates. Currently the population is roughly 390 male inmates. The facility was designed for PDP's female population. Each unit's management group includes a lieutenant, sergeant and treatment clerical staff. The facility contains classrooms for education and training, an intake and discharge area, and a gymnasium, The medical and behavioral health offices include a nurses' station, pharmacy, lab, dental, examination, x-ray, and emergency treatment rooms, as well as areas for AIDS counseling, records, equipment, and other storage.

The Dorms at RCF houses minimum and community-custody men and women, inmates serving sentences on weekends, work release inmates and others. Inmates may be selected by the PDP or ordered by the courts to participate in the work-release program. The program attempted to reintegrate prisoners into society with employment training. Some inmates sentenced to the work-release program continue in the jobs they had prior to incarceration, and has GED-preparation classes.

Riverside Correctional Facility switched to house males in summer of 2020 as part of a department reorganization to maximize bed space.

=== Defunct prisons ===
- Holmesburg Prison (decommissioned in 1995)
- Philadelphia House of Correction (depopulated in 2018, anticipated closure and decommission in 2020)

== Oversight ==
There is a Prison Advisory Board which is supposed to offer oversight and guidance to the Philadelphia Department of Prisons administration. In 2022, a board member resigned criticizing the board of being ineffective, of failing to provide real oversight, advice, or action. Since the COVID-19 pandemic, she noted that there had been 29 deaths, inmate disturbances, staff protests, federal lawsuits, and whistleblower reports. She recommended the creation of an independent civilian oversight board with defined powers, transparency, and freedom from conflicts of interest, which engaged with those most affected by the prisons including incarcerated individuals, their families, corrections officers, and community organizations. She also said should have access to prisons, the authority to request information, and the ability to make binding recommendations. Sufficient staffing, support for corrections officers, and site maintenance had been reported as issues leading to disturbances and failure to keep prisoners and staff safe. In 2025, a Prison Oversight Board was placed on the ballot, shephereded by Philadelphia City Council member Isaiah Thomas.
