= Delaware Township, Philadelphia County, Pennsylvania =

Delaware Township
- Former Township
- Location of Delaware Township in Pennsylvania Delaware Township (the United States)
- Coordinates: 40°03′47″N 74°59′42″W
- Country: United States
- State: Pennsylvania
- County: Philadelphia
- Time zone: UTC-5 (EST)
  - Summer (DST): UTC-4 (EDT)
- Area codes: 215, 267, and 445

Delaware Township was a township that was located in Philadelphia County, Pennsylvania, United States. The borough ceased to exist and was incorporated into the City of Philadelphia following the passage of the Act of Consolidation, 1854.

== History ==
A township formed out of eastern Lower Dublin Township in 1853. Its inhabitants voted at one general election. Its officers were superseded in the next year by consolidation.

== Notable people ==
- Thomas Holme, the first surveyor of the colonial-era Province of Pennsylvania who developed the first designs for the city of Philadelphia.

== Resources ==
- Chronology of the Political Subdivisions of the County of Philadelphia, 1683-1854 (Daly, John; Weinberg, Allen (October 1966). Genealogy of Philadelphia County Subdivisions (Second ed.). Philadelphia Dept. of Records.)
- Information courtesy of ushistory.org
- Incorporated District, Boroughs, and Townships in the County of Philadelphia, 1854 By Rudolph J. Walther - excerpted from the book at the ushistory.org website
