= Albert Kligman =

American dermatologist

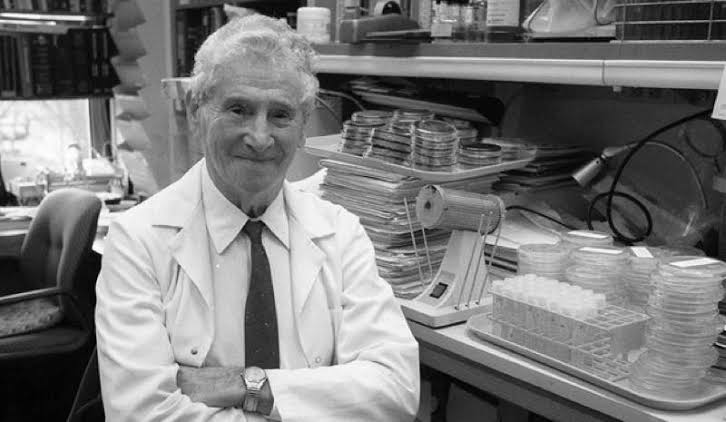
Albert Kligman

Albert Montgomery Kligman (March 17, 1916 – February 9, 2010) was an American dermatologist who co-invented Retin-A, the acne medication, with James Fulton in 1969. Kligman performed human experiments on inmates at Holmesburg Prison in Philadelphia, which led to a well-documented scandal years later. The experiments intentionally exposed humans to pathogens and dioxin, and later became a textbook example of unethical experimenting on humans. He and others involved were sued for alleged injuries, but the lawsuit was dismissed due to the statute of limitations expiring.

== Biography ==
Albert Montgomery Kligman was born in Philadelphia on March 17, 1916, the son of Jewish immigrants. His father, born in Ukraine, was a newspaper distributor; his mother, born in England, was a sales clerk. As a child, he was a Boy Scout, developing a love of plants on scouting trips to the countryside.

With financial support from Simon Greenberg, a major rabbi of the time, he attended Pennsylvania State University, earning a bachelor's degree in 1939. He was captain of the gymnastics team.

He went on to receive a Ph.D. in botany from the University of Pennsylvania in 1942, specializing in the study of fungi. He continued at the University of Pennsylvania, enrolling in its medical school, earning his M.D. in 1947. He chose dermatology as his specialty in order to apply his expertise in fungi.

Upon graduation, he joined the dermatology faculty as an associate, also signing on at the Hospital of the University of Pennsylvania.

== Scholarship and inventions ==
Kligman was a prolific scholar and was known for bringing scientific rigor to a field that, at the time, was lacking it. Kligman wrote numerous papers on run-of-the-mill dermatological conditions such as athlete's foot and dandruff. He also worked at the intersection of cosmetics and medicine.

The identification of the use of tretinoin along Dr. James E. Fulton and Dr. Gerd Plewig as a treatment for acne and wrinkles was perhaps their best-known contribution to dermatology. Sold as Retin-A, this innovation earned Kligman significant royalties. He was a generous supporter of the department of dermatology at the University of Pennsylvania and donated over $4 million by 1998.

== Unethical dermatological experiments ==
Kligman is best known for having conducted human experiments on prisoners at Holmesburg Prison in Philadelphia. Stemming from early testing of treatments for ringworm, his work there started with an effort to control athlete's foot at the invitation of prison officials. He found the environment fraught with possibilities, and undertook dozens of experiments there for pharmaceutical companies and government agencies. Between 1951 and 1974, Kligman exposed approximately seventy prisoners at Holmesburg to high doses of dioxin, the contaminant responsible for Agent Orange's toxicity to humans. Dow Chemical paid Kligman to conduct these dioxin experiments. Prisoners were awarded for participation, their primary source of income, in 1959 acquiring in total $73,000 by volunteering to test pills and creams. Little effort was taken to assure the safety of the test subjects, some of whom were intentionally exposed to pathogens causing infections, including herpes, staphylococcus, and athlete's foot. Moreover, Kligman's payment of subjects had other unintended consequences: the economic power gained by subjects was used by some of them to "coerce sexual favors from other inmates".

Kligman's prisoner testing for the government was not limited to dermatology, extending even to the testing of psychoactive drugs for the Department of Defense.

While Kligman maintained that the testing was consistent with scientific and ethical norms of the era, nearly 300 subjects tested while in prison sued him, the University of Pennsylvania, and Johnson & Johnson. The lawsuit was brought because of violations of the Nuremberg Code. Though the suit was dismissed under the statute of limitations, the public reaction to the testing program contributed to the enactment of federal regulations restricting medical studies in prisons. Later commentators, including Senator Ted Kennedy, remarked how, in spite of the sets of ethical principles laid out in the 1947 Nuremberg Code and (much later) the Declaration of Helsinki, the poorer members of society typically bore the brunt of unethical biomedical research; Kligman's research at Holmesburg prison has become a textbook example of such unethical experimenting.

Beyond the controversies relating to the testing on prisoners, Kligman was found to have discrepancies in the data underlying his experiments. This led to his research being barred by the Food and Drug Administration for a period.

== Personal life ==
Kligman was married three times. He divorced from his first wife and became a widower from his second. He died of a heart attack in February, 2010, at age 93. He was survived by his third wife.

== See also ==
- Acres of Skin: Human Experiments at Holmesburg Prison, an account of Kligman's Holmesburg experiments.
- Human experimentation in the United States
