= Unethical human experimentation =

Human experimentation that violates ethical principles

Unethical human experimentation is human experimentation that violates the principles of medical ethics. Such practices have included denying patients the right to informed consent, using pseudoscientific frameworks such as race science, and torturing people under the guise of research. Around World War II, Imperial Japan and Nazi Germany carried out brutal experiments on prisoners and civilians through groups like Unit 731 or individuals like Josef Mengele; the Nuremberg Code was developed after the war in response to the Nazi experiments. Countries have carried out brutal experiments on marginalized populations. Examples include American abuses during Project MKUltra and the Tuskegee syphilis experiments, and the mistreatment of indigenous populations in Canada and Australia. The Declaration of Helsinki, developed by the World Medical Association, is widely regarded as the cornerstone document on human research ethics.

== Nazi Germany ==
Nazi Germany performed human experimentation on large numbers of prisoners (including children), largely Jews from across Europe, but also Romani, Sinti, ethnic Poles, Soviet prisoners of war, homosexuals and disabled Germans, in its concentration camps mainly in the early 1940s, during World War II and the Holocaust. Prisoners were forced into participating; they did not willingly volunteer and no consent was given for the procedures. Typically, the experiments resulted in death, trauma, illness, shortening of life, disfigurement, or permanent disability, and as such are considered as examples of medical torture since the participants had to endure mass amounts of pain.

At Auschwitz and other German camps, under the direction of Eduard Wirths, selected inmates were subjected to various hazardous experiments that were designed to help German military personnel in combat situations, develop new weapons, aid in the recovery of military personnel who had been injured, and to advance the racial ideology backed by the Third Reich. Aribert Heim conducted similar medical experiments at Mauthausen. At Buchenwald, Carl Værnet conducted experiments on homosexual prisoners in an attempt to "cure" homosexuality.

After the war, these crimes were tried at what became known as the Doctors' Trial, and the abuses perpetrated led to the development of the Nuremberg Code of medical ethics. During the Nuremberg Trials, 23 Nazi doctors and scientists were tried for the unethical treatment of concentration camp inmates, who were often used as research subjects with fatal consequences. Of those 23, 16 were convicted (15 were convicted for the unethical treatment, while one of them was only convicted of SS membership), 7 were condemned to death, 9 received prison sentences from 10 years to life, and 7 were acquitted.

=== Before World War II ===
The Law for the Prevention of Genetically Defective Progeny, passed on 14 July 1933, legalized the involuntary sterilization of persons with diseases claimed to be hereditary: weak-mindedness, schizophrenia, alcohol abuse, insanity, blindness, deafness, and physical deformities. The law was used to encourage growth of the Aryan race through the sterilization of persons who fell under the quota of being genetically defective. 1% of citizens between the age of 17 to 24 had been sterilized within two years of the law passing. Within four years, 300,000 patients had been sterilized. From about March 1941 to about January 1945, sterilization experiments were conducted at Auschwitz, Ravensbrück, and other places by Carl Clauberg. The purpose of these experiments was to develop a method of sterilization which would be suitable for sterilizing millions of people with a minimum of time and effort. These experiments were conducted by means of X-ray, surgery and various drugs. Thousands of victims were sterilized. Aside from its experimentation, the Nazi government sterilized around 400,000 people as part of its compulsory sterilization program. Intravenous injections of solutions speculated to contain iodine and silver nitrate were successful, but had unwanted side effects, such as vaginal bleeding, severe abdominal pain, and cervical cancer. Therefore, radiation treatment became the favored choice of sterilization. Specific amounts of exposure to radiation destroyed a person's ability to produce ova or sperm. The radiation was administered through deception. Prisoners were brought into a room and asked to complete forms, which took two to three minutes. In this time, the radiation treatment was administered and, unknown to the prisoners, they were rendered completely sterile. Many suffered severe radiation burns.

Eugen Fischer began sterilization experimentation in German-occupied South West Africa during World War I. A supporter of forced sterilization as a means to prevent the growth of inferior populations and a member of the Nazi Party, Fischer focused his experimentation on mixed-race children in order to justify the Nazi Party's ban on interracial marriage. As a result of Fischer's research in Namibia, Germany prohibited marriages between people of different races in its colonies.

=== During World War II ===
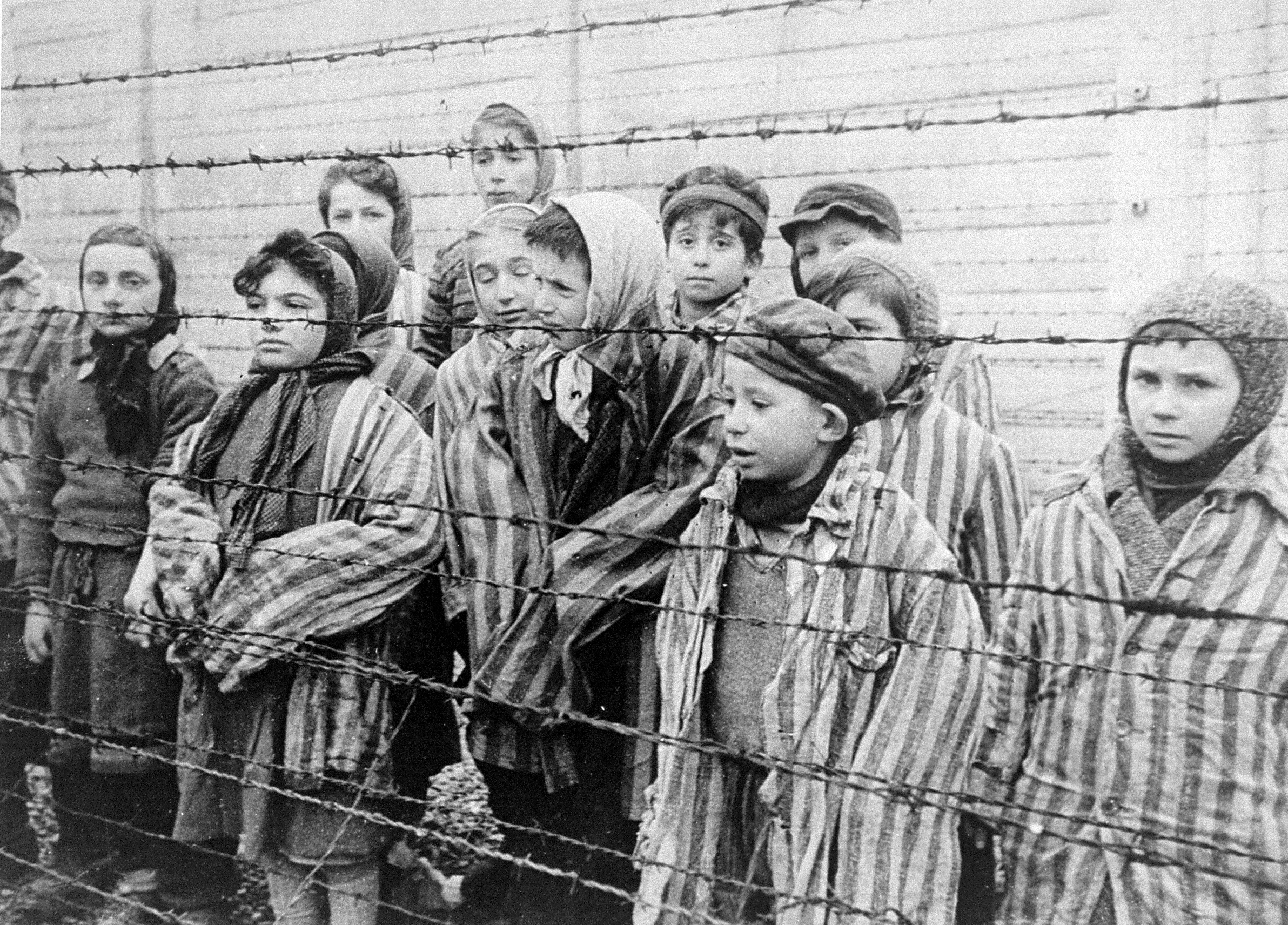
Jewish twins were kept alive to be used in Josef Mengele's medical experiments. These children from Auschwitz were liberated by the Red Army in January 1945.

The Luftwaffe performed a series of 360 to 400 experiments at Dachau and Auschwitz, in which hypothermia was induced in 280 to 300 victims. These were conducted for the Nazi high command to simulate the conditions the armies suffered on the Eastern Front, as the German forces were ill-prepared for the cold weather they encountered. Many experiments were conducted on captured Russian troops; the Nazis wondered whether their genetics gave them superior resistance to cold. Approximately 100 people are reported to have died as a result of these experiments.

In early 1942, prisoners at Dachau concentration camp were used by Sigmund Rascher in experiments to aid German pilots who had to eject at high altitudes. A low-pressure chamber containing these prisoners was used to simulate conditions at altitudes of up to 20,000 m (66,000 ft). Of the 200 subjects, 80 died outright, and the others were executed.

Other experiments included: an experiment in repeated head injury which drove a boy insane, experiments at Buchenwald where poisons were secretly administered in food, experiments to test the effect of various pharmaceutical preparations on phosphorus burns induced with material from incendiary bombs, experiments at Ravensbrück to investigate the effectiveness of sulfonamide after infection with bacteria such as Clostridium perfringens (the causative agent in gas gangrene) and Clostridium tetani (the causative agent in tetanus), experiments conducted to attempt treatments of chemical burns induced by mustard gas and similar compounds, and experiments at Dachau to study various methods of making sea water drinkable.

Many of the subjects died as a result of the experiments, while many others were executed after the tests were completed to study the effects post mortem. Those who survived were often left mutilated, which resulted in permanent disability, weakened bodies, and mental distress.

The results of the Dachau freezing experiments have been used in some modern research into the treatment of hypothermia, with at least 45 publications having referenced the experiments since the Second World War. This, together with the recent use of data from Nazi research into the effects of phosgene gas, has proven controversial and presents an ethical dilemma for modern physicians who do not agree with the methods used to obtain this data. Some object on an ethical basis, and others have rejected Nazi research purely on scientific grounds, pointing out methodological inconsistencies. In an often-cited review of the Dachau hypothermia experiments, Berger states that the study has "all the ingredients of a scientific fraud" and that the data "cannot advance science or save human lives."

Several Nazi experimenters were after the war employed by the United States government in Operation Paperclip and later similar efforts.

== Japan ==
=== Empire of Japan ===
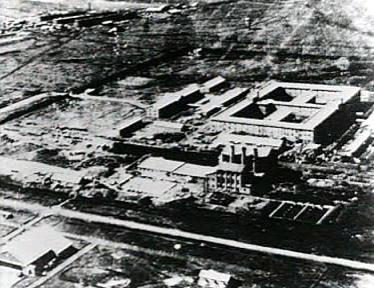
Japanese Unit 731 Complex that used humans for experimentation for biological and chemical weapons, as well as live vivisections and other experiments

Human subject research in Japan began in World War II. It continued for some years after. Unit 731, a department of the Imperial Japanese Army located near Harbin (then in the puppet state of Manchukuo, in northeast China), experimented on prisoners by conducting vivisections, dismemberments, and bacterial inoculations. It induced epidemics on a very large scale from 1932 onward through the Second Sino-Japanese War. It also conducted biological and chemical weapons tests on prisoners and captured POWs. With the expansion of the empire during World War II, similar units were set up in conquered cities such as Nanjing (Unit 1644), Beijing (Unit 1855), Guangzhou (Unit 8604) and Singapore (Unit 9420). After the war, Supreme Commander of the Occupation Douglas MacArthur gave immunity in the name of the United States to Shirō Ishii and all members of the units in exchange for all of the results of their experiments. The US blocked Soviet access to this information. The Soviets prosecuted some of the Unit 731 members during its Khabarovsk War Crime Trials.

In November 2006, Doctor Akira Makino confessed to Kyodo News that he had performed surgery and amputations on condemned prisoners, including women and children, in 1944 and 1945 while he was stationed on Mindanao. Most of Makino's victims were Moro Muslims. In 2007, Doctor Ken Yuasa testified to The Japan Times and said that he believes that at least 1,000 persons working for the Shōwa regime, including surgeons, conducted surgical research in mainland China.

=== State of Japan ===
In incidents throughout the 1950s, former Unit 731 members infected prisoners and mental health patients with deadly diseases. In 1958, a large number of infants were brought to Kobe Medical School and forcibly administered sugar by having needles inserted through their noses and into their stomachs. A tube was inserted into their anuses to determine how the sugar was processed by their digestive systems. Many of the infants experienced diarrhea and anal bleeding. The parents were never informed that their children were being used as test subjects.

The US army and Japanese government they installed refused to help Japanese atomic bomb victims (Hibakusha) and instead collected data on them and took samples of their organs after they died. The US military paid Japanese members of Unit 731 to conduct experiments on Japanese people in Japan in 1952, with a Japanese girl dying after multiple Japanese babies were deliberately infected with E. coli bacteria at Nagoya City University Hospital by Jiro Ogawa. Japanese patients at a mental hospital were infected with scrub typhus in 1953–1956, with one killing himself to escape the torture and another nine patients dying of the typhus itself.

== Indigenous Australians ==
In the 1920s and 1930s, Aboriginal Australians and Torres Strait Islanders were subject to medical experiments on how they experienced pain and where body measurements and blood samples were forcibly taken. The experiments were motivated by a system of scientific racism and were carried out by researchers from the University of Adelaide. In 2002, the vice chancellor of the university described the experiments as "degrading and in some cases barbarous" and the school issued a formal apology to Aboriginal and Torres Strait Islander groups.

== Indigenous populations in Canada ==
Canada has historically carried out unethical medical experiments on indigenous populations in concert with its policies of forced cultural assimilation. In 1933, about 600 Native children from the reserves near Qu'Appelle, Saskatchewan, were enrolled in a trial to test the tuberculosis vaccine. During the course of the trial, in both the control and treatment groups nearly a fifth "died from diseases of poverty, gastroenteritis and pneumonia, as a result of the lethal living conditions on the reserves." Parental consent was not sought for indigenous children, though it was sought for the non-indigenous. Between 1942 and 1952, malnourished children from six residential schools were used in experiments without consent or parental notification. They were split into treatment and control groups and denied increases in nutrition, despite the researchers believing malnutrition to be a serious problem in the schools, as they were used to determine whether certain combinations of supplements mitigated problems. Children died, developed anemia, and were in some cases denied dental care previously available to them as they developed cavities and gingivitis. The experiments were run by the Department of Indian Affairs of Canada and directed by Percy Moore and Frederick Tisdall, a former president of the Canadian Paediatric Society. In 2014, the Society released a statement outlining guidelines for community-based participatory research involving Inuit, Métis, and First Nations youth.

== Canada (General) ==
From 1957 to 1964, a series of CIA-funded unethical medical experiments known as the Montreal experiments, or MKUltra Subproject 69, were carried out in Montreal by Scottish psychiatrist Donald Ewen Cameron at McGill University's Allan Memorial Institute. While the official purpose of these experiments was to "cure" schizophrenia by reprogramming patients' memories, it is suspected they were actually attempts to master mind control. Patients, who were often admitted into the hospital in vulnerable conditions, were not informed that they were being used for experimental research. They were subjected to abusive techniques such as intensive electroconvulsive therapy, sensory deprivation, drug-induced comas, and repeated audio messages that resulted in memory loss and long-term psychological impacts. In addition, a case was brought forward in 2023 by the Mohawk Mothers against McGill University asserting the presence of unmarked graves following these experiments on the site of the Institute, which McGill is contesting. They claim that these graves belong to both Indigenous and non-Indigenous patients.

== Guatemala ==
From 1946 to 1948 US scientific researchers in Guatemala infected hundreds of mental patients with sexually transmitted diseases (STDs). Researchers from the US Public Health Service (PHS) conducted experiments on approximately 1,500 male and female patients housed at Guatemala's National Mental Health Hospital. The scientists injected the patients with gonorrhea and syphilis—and encouraged many of them to pass the disease on to others. The experiments were done in cooperation with the Guatemalan government. The PHS carried out the experiments under the guise of syphilis inoculations. In 2010 these experiments were revealed by Susan Reverby of Wellesley College, who was researching a book on the Tuskegee syphilis experiments. The US Secretary of State Hillary Clinton issued an official apology to Guatemala. President Barack Obama apologized to President Álvaro Colom, who had called these experiments "a crime against humanity."

== Sweden ==
The Vipeholm experiments were a series of human experiments where patients of Vipeholm Hospital for the intellectually disabled in Lund, Sweden, were fed large amounts of sweets to provoke dental caries between 1945 and 1955. The experiments were sponsored both by the sugar industry and dentist community, in an effort to determine whether carbohydrates affected the formation of cavities. The experiments provided extensive knowledge about dental health and resulted in enough empirical data to link the intake of sugar to dental caries. However, today they are considered to have violated the principles of medical ethics.

== Soviet Union ==
The Soviet Union manufactured and tested poisons in the poison laboratory of the Soviet secret services, variously known as Special Office, Laboratory 1, Laboratory 12, Central Investigation Institute for Special Technology and Kamera (Russian: Камера). The laboratory was reportedly reactivated by the Russian government in the late 1990s.

Grigory Mairanovsky, head of Laboratory 1, and his colleagues tested a variety of lethal poisons on prisoners from the Gulags, including mustard gas, ricin, digitoxin, curare, cyanide, and many others. The objective of these experiments was to identify a tasteless, odorless chemical that could not be detected post mortem. Candidate poisons were administered to the victims along with a meal or drink, disguised as "medication". Mairanovsky intentionally brought individuals of various physical conditions and ages into the laboratory to comprehensively understand the effects of each poison.

Pavel Sudoplatov and Nahum Eitingon approved specialized equipment (namely, poisons) only if it had been tested on "humans", as revealed in the testimony of Mikhail Filimonov. Vsevolod Merkulov stated that these experiments received authorization from NKVD chief Lavrentiy Beria. Following Stalin's death and Beria's subsequent arrest, Beria attested on 28 August 1953, that "I gave orders to Mairanovsky to conduct experiments on people sentenced to the highest measure of punishment, but it was not my idea".

== United Kingdom ==
De-classified documents from The National Archives revealed that during the 20th century, scientists from Porton Down conducted experiments on British and Indian soldiers to test the effects of mustard gas. From 1916 until 1989, more than 20,000 British servicemen were subjected to chemical warfare trials. The experiments on Indian servicemen were conducted in Rawalpindi, British India, during the 1930s and 1940s. It is unclear whether the Indian trial subjects, some of whom were hospitalized as a result of their injuries, were all volunteers. In the 1950s, Royal Air Force engineer Ronald Maddison was killed when he was exposed to 200 milligrams of sarin at Porton Down. He had believed that he was testing a cure for the common cold, and in 2004 a High Court judgement ruled that his death was "unlawful".

Between 1940 and 1979, the Ministry of Defence secretly dispersed potentially dangerous chemicals and micro-organisms across much of the country to evaluate readiness against a biological attack from the Soviet Union. They dropped zinc cadmium sulphide from aircraft and dispersed it by land to track the spread of fluorescent particles, and also spread E. coli, Bacillus globigii, and Serratia marcescens bacteria.

== Turkey ==
The Depth Research Laboratory (DAL) was the name given to the political branch known as "D Group" within the Ankara Police Department in the period following the 12 September Coup. D Group later became known as DAL, the initials of the Depth Research Laboratory. The branch came to prominence for systematic torture and ill-treatment of detainees following the 12 September Coup.

Muazzez İlmiye Çığ was the chair of the board of the HZİ Neuropsychiatry Foundation and chief advisor to the leader of the Homeland Party, which came into the spotlight after allegations of experimenting on political prisoners during the 12 September coup. The HZİ Neuropsychiatry Foundation takes its name from the initials of Çığ's mother, Hamide, and father, Zekeriya İtil. Numerous allegations have been made against the foundation that it conducted studies in Turkey testing drugs banned for use in the US on patients and prisoners. Çığ, İtil, their friends, family, and some of the foundation's staff denied the accusations. They claimed that the experiments were conducted with voluntary participation and were intended to profile terrorists under the HZİ Foundation's supervision, with the permission of the 12 September Military Junta.

== United States ==
Since the late 19th century, numerous human experiments were performed in the US which were later characterized as unethical. They were often performed illegally, without the knowledge, consent, or informed consent of the test subjects. Examples have included the deliberate infection of people with deadly or debilitating diseases, exposing people to biological and chemical weapons, human radiation experiments, injecting people with toxic and radioactive chemicals, surgical experiments, interrogation/torture experiments, tests involving mind-altering substances, and a wide variety of others. Many of these tests were performed on children and mentally disabled individuals. In many of the studies, a large number of the subjects were poor, racial minorities, and/or prisoners. Often, subjects were sick or disabled people, whose doctors told them that they were receiving "medical treatment". They were used as the subjects of harmful and deadly experiments, without their knowledge or consent. In reaction to this, interest groups and institutions have worked to design policies and oversight to ensure that future human subject research in the US would be ethical and legal.

During World War II, Fort Detrick in Maryland was the headquarters of US biological warfare experiments. Operation Whitecoat involved the injection of infectious agents into military forces to observe their effects in human subjects.

Public outcry over the discovery of government experiments on human subjects led to numerous congressional investigations and hearings, including the Church Committee, Rockefeller Commission, and Advisory Committee on Human Radiation Experiments, amongst others. These inquiries have not resulted in prosecutions. Not all subjects involved in the trials have been compensated or notified that they were subjects of such trials.

In the 1950s and 1960s, Chester M. Southam injected HeLa cancer cells into healthy individuals, cancer patients, and prison inmates from the Ohio Penitentiary. This experiment raised many bioethical concerns involving informed consent, non-maleficence, and beneficence. Some of Southam's subjects, namely those that already had cancer, were unaware that they were being injected with malignant cells. Additionally, in one of these patients, the cells metastasized to her lymph nodes.

In 1962, the Kefauver-Harris Drug Amendment was passed by the US Congress. This amendment made changes to the Federal Food Drug & Consumer Act by requiring drug companies to prove both safety and effectiveness of their products. Consequently, drugs were required to have Food and Drug Administration (FDA) approval before being marketed to consumers. Additionally, informed consent became a participation requirement and rules were put into place. This regulation was influenced by the results of 1950 use of thalidomide in Western Europe for pregnant women. They were prescribed the sedative thalidomide, which was inaccurately marketed as a morning sickness treatment. Women gave birth to more than 12,000 infants born with deformities due to effects from the drug in utero.

In the Tuskegee syphilis experiment from 1932 to 1972, the US Public Health Service contracted with the Tuskegee Institute for a long-term study of syphilis. During the study, more than 600 African-American men were studied who were not told they had syphilis. In an effort to better understand the disease, researchers denied the men access to the known treatment of the antibiotic penicillin. They recorded observations of the effects of the disease over time. Under the impression they were being treated for "bad blood", the participants were given free healthcare by the government. As ineffective treatment was given to the subjects, two-thirds of the group had died by the end of the 40-year experiment. A leak in 1972 led to cessation of the study and severe legal ramifications. It has been widely regarded as the "most infamous biomedical research study in U.S. history". Because of the public outrage, in 1974 Congress passed the National Research Act, to provide for protection of human subjects in experiments. The National Commission for the Protection of Human Subjects of Biomedical and Behavioral Research was established. It was tasked with establishing the boundary between research and routine practice, the role of risk-benefit analysis, guidelines for participation, and the definition of informed consent. Its Belmont Report established three tenets of ethical research: respect for persons, beneficence, and justice.

Project MKUltra—sometimes referred to as the "CIA's mind control program"—was the code name given to an illegal program of experiments on human subjects, designed and undertaken by the US Central Intelligence Agency (CIA). Experiments on humans were intended to identify and develop drugs and procedures to be used in interrogations and torture, in order to weaken the individual to force confessions through mind control. Organized through the Scientific Intelligence Division of the CIA, the project coordinated with the Special Operations Division of the US Army's Chemical Corps. The program began in the early 1950s, was officially sanctioned in 1953, was reduced in scope in 1964, further curtailed in 1967 and officially halted in 1973. The program engaged in many illegal activities; in particular it used unwitting US and Canadian citizens as its test subjects, which led to controversy regarding its legitimacy. MKUltra used numerous methodologies to manipulate people's mental states and alter brain functions, including the surreptitious administration of drugs (especially LSD) and other chemicals, hypnosis, sensory deprivation, isolation, verbal and sexual abuse, as well as various forms of torture.

=== Beecher Paper ===
In a 1966 paper, Harvard anesthesiologist Henry K. Beecher described 22 published medical studies in which patients had been subjects with no expected benefit to the patient of the experiment. This has been characterized as unethical. For example, patients infused with live cancer cells had been told in one study that they were receiving "some cells", without being told this was cancer. Though identities of the authors and institutions had been stripped, the 22 studies were later identified as having been conducted by mainstream researchers and published in prestigious journals within approximately the previous decade. The 22 cases had been selected from a set of 50 that Beecher had collected. He presented evidence that such unethical studies were widespread and represented a systemic problem in medical research rather than exceptions.

Beecher had been writing about human experimentation and publicizing cases that he considered to be bad practice for nearly a decade. His 1965 briefing to science writers and his 1966 paper gained widespread news coverage and stimulated public reaction. The paper has been described as "the most influential single paper ever written about experimentation involving human subjects." The US Office for Human Research Protections credits Beecher through this paper as "ultimately contributing to the impetus for the first NIH and FDA regulations."

Beecher was instrumental in developing solutions to such abuses. He noted that a common element in these studies was that some experimental subjects, such as military personnel or mentally handicapped children in institutions, were not in a position to freely decline consent. Beecher believed that rules requiring informed consent were not alone sufficient, as truly informed consent was an unattainable ideal. He worked both to define the rules and conditions for informed consent, and to establish institutional review boards as an additional layer of oversight regarding research protocols.

== International drug trials ==
Since the late 20th century, African nations have often been the sites of clinical testing by large international pharmaceutical companies. In some cases, rural communities have developed iatrophobia (fear of doctors) after undergoing or learning of highly controversial medical experimentation. The fundamental distrust lies in the potential confrontation of Hobson's choice: "Experimental medicine or no medicine at all". Multiple cases of ethically questionable experiments have been documented.

In the late 20th century, Depo-Provera was clinically tested on Zimbabwean women. Once approved, the drug was used as a population control measure in the 1970s. Commercial farm owners put pressure on native women workers to accept the use of Depo-Provera. Population control interests motivated many of the family planning programs. This led to its eventual ban in Zimbabwe.

A 1996 clinical trial in Kano, Nigeria, involving the Pfizer drug Trovan to treat meningitis resulted in 200 children being disabled and the deaths of 11. Because of these casualties, the Nigerian government sued Pfizer over whether it had appropriately obtained informed consent. Pfizer argued in court that it had met all regulations for drug testing. Many Nigerians mistrust the use of medical vaccines and also refuse to participate in medical trials.

In 1994, US drug companies began conducting trials of the drug AZT on HIV-positive African subjects with the goal of developing treatments to reduce the transmission of HIV/AIDS during childbirth. With funding from the National Institutes of Health (NIH) and Centers for Disease Control (CDC), the program tested over 17,000 Zimbabwean women for the efficacy of AZT in preventing transmission of HIV/AIDS during childbirth. Half of the women were given a placebo rather than the drug, and the subjects were not informed of the potential dangers of the treatment. According to Peter Lamptey, the head of the AIDS Control and Prevention Program, "if you interviewed the people in the study, most wouldn't understand to what they had actually consented." An estimated 1,000 newborns of women in the study contracted HIV/AIDS, although this could have been avoided by treating the women with known drugs. The testing was ceased in 1998 when the CDC claimed to have obtained sufficient data from experiments in Thailand.

== See also ==
- Medical torture
  - Pharmacological torture
- Patient abuse
- Political abuse of psychiatry
- Project Coast
