= Public Responsibility in Medicine and Research =

Nonprofit organisation

- Abbreviation: PRIM&R
- Formation: 1974
- Headquarters: Boston, Massachusetts
- Members: 4,000
- Executive Director: Ivy R. Tillman, EdD, CIP
- Staff: 18

Public Responsibility in Medicine and Research (PRIM&R) is a 501(c)(3) nonprofit organization based in Boston, Massachusetts. The organization was formed in 1974 by a group of researchers who sought to ensure that the concerns and experiences of those working in biomedical research would be reflected in the growing body of federal regulations governing the field.

Among PRIM&R's principal activities are education, membership services, certification programs, public policy initiatives, and professional development programs. The key constituencies for PRIM&R's programming are human research protection professionals, animal care and use professionals, federal representatives, institutional officials, researchers and research staff, representatives of pharmaceutical and biotechnology companies, those working with community and voluntary health organizations, and ethicists.

PRIM&R has a membership of more than 4,000 individuals worldwide.

== Educational Programs ==
=== Annual Conferences ===
PRIM&R hosts a number of educational programs, including two annual conferences, the Advancing Ethical Research (AER) Conference and the Institutional Animal Care and Use Committee (IACUC) Conference.

The AER Conference is held in the fall of each year, and focuses on human subject protections. This meeting spans three days and draws approximately 2,500 attendees. The structure of the conference generally consists of three to four keynote and plenary addresses, 14 to 16 panels, and more than 120 breakout sessions organized into 25 to 30 topical tracks. Past speakers have included Jay Katz, Francis S. Collins, Rebecca Skloot, Stanley Milgram, Philip Zimbardo, Jerome Groopman, Jonathan Haidt, Robert Temple, Frances Kelsey, Dan Ariely, Seth Mnookin, Eva Mozes Kor, Louis Lasagna, Keith Norris, Susan Reverby, Joshua Sharfstein, Jonathan Woodson, and Ellen Wright Clayton.

The two-day IACUC Conference focuses on issues pertaining to the care and use of animals in research. It typically draws 600 to 700 attendees, and includes three to four keynote and plenary addresses, four to five panels, and approximately 75 breakout sessions. Past speakers have included Temple Grandin, Bernard Rollin, Evan Snyder, Colin Blakemore, Henry Spira, Tom Beauchamp, Stuart Zola, Margaret Landi, and Georgia Mason.

Additionally, PRIM&R has hosted a number of smaller meetings on new developments in research, including dedicated conferences on AIDS, organ transplantation, reproductive technologies, ethical issues in social, behavioral, and educational research (SBER), privacy and confidentiality, conflicts of interest, the responsible conduct of research, and the Health Insurance Portability and Accountability Act (HIPAA).

=== Pre-Conference Programs ===
PRIM&R's pre-conference programs, usually one day in length, precede the AER and IACUC conferences, and provide attendees with the opportunity to engage in intensive examination of key areas in the field of research oversight. Each course is aimed at providing participants with an understanding of both the regulatory and ethical precepts underlying work in medical research. Annual pre-conference offerings include:

- IRB 101^{sm} (an introduction to the history and regulations that govern the institutional review board (IRB)),
- IACUC 101 (an overview of the laws, regulations, and policies that govern the humane care and use of laboratory animals),
- IRB 201 (a detailed look at the criteria for review of research protocols),
- Essentials of IACUC Administration (an examination of the key components of an integrated animal care and use program), and
- Advanced Research Ethics (an advanced course that explores complex topics in human research protections).

In addition, special in-depth programs on hot topics in the field are regularly offered. Past programs have addressed informed consent, investigator responsibilities, tissue banking, research in resource-scarce countries, and internet research.

=== Regional Meetings ===
PRIM&R offers two to three regional meetings each year to promote shared problem solving, networking, and communication among the research ethics professionals in a given region. Past locations for regional meetings have included Atlanta, Boston, Chicago, Houston, San Francisco, St. Louis, Tucson, Durban, South Africa, Malawi, and Singapore. Courses that have been offered in these cities include Essentials of IACUC Administration, Institutional Review Board (IRB) 101sm, IRB 201, IRB 250, and IRB Administration 101.

=== At Your Doorstep Programs ===
At Your Doorstep (AYD) is a customizable offering that brings PRIM&R's educational programming and faculty directly to an institution. Since its launch in 1998, PRIM&R's AYD program has brought its two most popular courses, IRB 101^{sm} and IRB 250, to more than 150 institutions, and has had more than 15,000 participants. AYD events have been hosted by Harvard Medical School, the Kaiser Foundation Research Institute, the US Centers for Disease Control and Prevention, the Mayo Clinic, and Johns Hopkins University.

=== Webinars ===
Since 2005, PRIM&R has offered webinars. PRIM&R currently produces between 12 and 14 webinars per year. Some recent webinar topics have included:

- Strategies for addressing challenges commonly faced by IACUCs and Institutional Review Board (IRBs)
- Applying ethical principles in research conducted abroad, and in research conducted over the internet
- Supporting the involvement of community IRB members
- Analysis of current events such as the proposed changes to the DHHS "Common Rule."

Webinars are generally taught by two speakers who present complementary aspects of a given topic.

=== Online Course ===
PRIM&R developed an interactive online course, titled Ethical Research Oversight Course (EROC), which explores the function and purpose of IRBs. This course was created to present reliable and affordable research ethics education individuals and institutions. The curriculum of this course is intended to provide IRB members with an understanding of the ethical and regulatory issues that underlie research with human subjects with the use of case studies.

== Networking and Professional Programs ==
=== Membership ===
A PRIM&R's membership includes professionals working with human subjects protections programs (HRPPs), animal care and use programs, institutional biosafety programs (IBCs), research ethics committees (RECs), and embryonic stem cell research oversight (ESCRO) committees, such as administrators, researchers, research staff, institutional officials, government representatives, subject advocates, ethicists, policy makers, pharmaceutical and biotechnology personnel, and attorneys.

==== History of Membership ====
In 1985, a membership division, the Applied Research Ethics National Association (ARENA), was created within PRIM&R to offer a professional community for IRB and IACUC members, administrators, and others interested in and concerned with applied research ethics. ARENA's mission was to "promote educational activities, networking, the resolution and/or amelioration of mutual problems, and the professional advancement of its members," and had 61 charter members. In 2006, ARENA membership was integrated into the organization as a whole, and the name ARENA was retired in July of that year.

==== Networking Programs ====
PRIM&R offers its members networking opportunities designed to encourage the exchange of knowledge among research ethics professionals, including a Regional Connections program, which offers small grants to members to plan and host events intended to facilitate collaboration, a Mentoring Program for professionals within the field of research ethics, and an electronic membership directory to facilitate connecting and networking with colleagues.

=== Organizational Publications and Resources ===
PRIM&R distributes several e-publications to its members. These include the Research Ethics Digest (RED), an electronic, bi-monthly compilation of recently published journal articles, news pieces, and essays related to research ethics; and the monthly Member Newsletter, which contains current information on research ethics and regulatory matters, as well as updates on PRIM&R activities.

In 2006, PRIM&R published a compilation of conference proceedings spanning from 1974 to 2005, titled PRIM&R Through the Years.

==== Knowledge Center ====
The PRIM&R website includes an online Knowledge Center that provides current and historical information and resources to the research community. The Knowledge Center is divided into six domains, each containing resources relating to a specific topic. These topics include selected regulations and guidance; historical cases and documents; PRIM&R program archives; a glossary of common terms; research ethics publications; and a database of best practices, standard operating procedures, and templates for those working in human research protection programs and animal care and use programs.

==== Ampersand ====
Launched on November 3, 2008, PRIM&R's blog, Ampersand, is a voice for the research ethics community. Contributions to Ampersand come from a variety of sources, including PRIM&R staff, board members, subject matter experts, members, and others involved in the research field. Ampersand posts are education-focused and provide commentary on news and issues in the research ethics field. Submissions to Ampersand are welcome from members and nonmembers alike.

=== Certification ===
==== Certified IRB Professional (CIP) ====
The CIP program is a certification initiative developed in 1999 for individuals administering institutional review boards (IRBs). The CIP credential was developed by a group of PRIM&R volunteers to promote standards for professional knowledge and to support adherence to regulatory requirements, best practices, and ethical standards in the conduct of medical research. Since the credential was launched, more than 2,100 individuals have attained CIP certification.

==== Certified Professional IACUC Administrator (CPIA) ====
PRIM&R developed the Certified Professional IACUC Administrator (CPIA) credential in 2006 for individuals administering institutional animal care and use committees (IACUCs). The CPIA credential is intended to provide formal recognition of an IACUC professional's knowledge of IACUC functions and expertise about animal care and use programs more broadly. Since the credential was launched, more than 300 individuals have become CPIA certified.

=== Public Policy ===
PRIM&R's Public Policy Committee (PPC) promotes policy development intended to reflect the highest ethical standards and best practices in research involving human subjects and animals. The PPC tracks policy initiatives and regulatory changes issued by government agencies and other organizations. The committee also oversees the development of oral and written comments on particular policies that it determines are relevant to PRIM&R's mission and warrant PRIM&R's input. Periodically, PRIM&R will appoint a task force to draft comments in response to a particular policy initiative.

Date	Topic
November 2014	In October 2014, the Office for Human Research Protections issued a request comment on a document titled "Draft Guidance on Disclosing Reasonably Foreseeable Risks in Research Evaluating Standards of Care." In this brief letter, PRIM&R requests that the comment period for the draft guidance be extended to 120 days to allow all interested parties sufficient opportunity to craft thoughtful comments that will assist the Federal government in the rulemaking process.
September 2014	In July 2014, the US Food and Drug Administration(FDA) announced they were seeking comment on a draft guidance document titled "Informed Consent Information Sheet: Guidance for IRBs, Clinical Investigators, and Sponsors." PRIM&R's response, which was submitted in September 2014, commended the FDA for their efforts to further clarify the responsibilities of IRBs, clinical investigators, and sponsors with respect to informed consent, and made several broad recommendations related to the presentation of risks, the responsibilities of investigators, the use of understandable language, the enrollment of non-English-speaking subjects, and the delineation between consent form and the consent process.
March 2014	In January 2014, the Presidential Commission for the Study of Bioethical Issues announced they were seeking public comment on "the ethical considerations of neuroscience research and the application of neuroscience research findings." PRIM&R responded in March 2014 and cautioned the Bioethics Commission against developing a set of guiding ethical principles for neuroscience research that is distinct from the principles of research ethics generally. PRIM&R also encouraged the group to revisit scholarship from past advisory groups, which speaks to how existing ethical and regulatory framework can be applied to at least a subset of neuroscience research.
November 2013	In September 2013, the National Institutes of Health issued a request for public comments on a draft Genomic Data Sharing (GDS) Policy intended to promote sharing, for research purposes, of large-scale human and nonhuman genomic data generated from NIH-supported and NIH-conducted research. PRIM&R responded in November 2013 by urging NIH to utilize current data sharing possibilities as first and foremost opportunities to educate the public about genomic research. PRIM&R's comments provide some preliminary suggestions for how to create a model of disclosure around data sharing that has this broad educational goal at its core.
August 2013	In June 2013, the Department of Health and Human Services (DHHS) announced a public meeting and comment period to seek input on matters related to the protection of human subjects of research when studying standard of care interventions. PRIM&R responded in August 2013 with suggestions for institutional review board evaluations of standard-of-care comparisons. In their response, PRIM&R also urged DHHS to look ahead and establish appropriate oversight systems for the burgeoning field of research intended to compare the effectiveness of health interventions.
April 2013	In March 2013, the National Science Board, the policy and advisory board of the National Science Foundation, issued a request for information (RFI) titled Reducing Investigator's Administrative Workload for Federally Funded Research. The RFI sought input from principal investigator's on Federal policies and institutional requirements that increase the administrative workload of investigators. In their response, PRIM&R advocated that any attempts to reduce administrative workload should remain directed at protecting research subjects.
October 2012	PRIM&R submitted comments to Congressman Edward Markey, (D-MA), on a bill titled "Trial and Experimental Studies Transparency (TEST) Act of 2012", which sought to increase transparency of clinical trials by expanding reporting and registration requirements for ClinicalTrials.gov. PRIM&R expressed support for increasing transparency of clinical trials, but cautioned that preliminary steps should be taken to analyze the efficacy of the current process before attempting to expand its requirements.
October 2011	Following the July 26, 2011 publication of the Advance Notice of Proposed Rulemaking on human subjects research protections, the Department of Health and Human Services' Office for Human Research Protections (OHRP) solicited feedback on the questions posed in the notice. PRIM&R responded with specific recommendations on the broad spectrum of topics put forward in the notice, including informed consent, privacy, centralized review, calibrating level of review to level of risk, and post-IRB human subjects protections.
August 2011	PRIM&R submitted a request to OHRP that the comment period for the Advance Notice of Proposed Rulemaking proposing changes to the "Common Rule" published July 26, 2011, be extended from 60 days to 120 days.
April 2011	PRIM&R drafted these comments in response to the Request for Comments on Human Subjects Protections in Scientific Studies by the Presidential Commission for the Study of Bioethical Issues. In their response, PRIM&R urges the commission to consider, and address, the current regulatory requirements for obtaining and documenting informed consent.
July 2011	The American Psychological Association put out a request for comments regarding the revised Guidelines for Ethical Conduct in the Care and Use of Nonhuman Animals in Research. PRIM&R responded by commending the APA for their commitment to ethical conduct and making a suggestion for the further clarification of the Guidelines.
June 2011	In response to a request for comments on the revised International Guiding Principles for Biomedical Research Involving Animals, PRIM&R submitted comments to CIOMS/ICLAS. PRIM&R supports the guidelines, which they describe as morally comprehensive, but would like to see explicit requirements for education for research personnel.
March 2010	PRIM&R developed these comments in response to the FDA's proposed rule on informed consent. PRIM&R supports efforts to fully inform potential research subjects of the risks, benefits and alternatives potentially encountered as a result of participating in research.
January 2010	PRIM&R filed comments in response to OHRP's Draft Guidance on IRB Approval of Research with Conditions. PRIM&R believes this draft guidance document is helpful, but has a few questions to further clarify the guidance. Similarly, PRIM&R commented this month on OHRP's Draft Guidance on IRB Continuing Review of Research. PRIM&R asserted that the draft guidance was helpful in clarifying ambiguities and had several suggestions to make the document clearer.

== Awards ==
Periodically, PRIM&R bestows awards to recognize those within the research ethics community who have demonstrated excellence in their fields.

=== Lifetime Achievement Award for Excellence in Research Ethics ===
This award recognizes individuals who have made extraordinary and exemplary contributions to advancing research ethics, and, more specifically, those who have mastered a large body of information, have applied sound analytical methods to the resolution of particular problems and sound critical methods to the resolutions proposed by themselves or others, have synthesized their findings and those of others into new comprehensive accounts, and have effectively communicated the fruits of their efforts to others.

2013	Joan Rachlin
2011	Ruth Faden and Tom Beauchamp
2009	Albert R. Jonsen
2005	Robert J. Levine
2003	Charles R. McCarthy
2001	Jay Katz

=== Founders Award ===
In 2005, PRIM&R bestowed the Founders Award to Joseph Byrne, Sanford Chodosh, Natalie Reatig, and Barbara Stanley. The award was intended to recognize the leadership, dedication, principles, and wisdom of four individuals who played critical roles in the founding of both PRIM&R and its former membership division, ARENA.

=== Distinguished Service Award ===
The Distinguished Service Award is designed to honor PRIM&R members who have not only made a long-standing commitment to PRIM&R, but have also made a valuable contribution to the ethical conduct of research and to enhanced compliance with federal regulations.

2014	Paula Knudson
2012	Mary Jo "MJ" Shepherd
2011	Ivor Pritchard
2010	Yvonne Higgins
2009	Charlotte Coley
2008	Jeremy Sugarman
2006	Bonnie M. Lee
2005	Ernest Prentice
2003	Gary Chadwick and Susan Kornetsky
2002	Joan Rachlin
2001	Karen Hansen
2000	Robert "Skip" Nelson
1999	Marky Pitts and Molly Greene
1998	Ada Sue Selwitz
1997	David Bernhardt
1996	Helen McGough

=== ARENA Legacy Award ===
Established in 2006, this annual award recognizes PRIM&R members who have made an outstanding contribution to the goals of PRIM&R by significantly promoting the ethical conduct of research through mentoring, teaching, and leadership.

2014	Susie Hoffman
2013	Dan Nelson
2012	Susan Delano
2011	Gianna McMillan
2010	Jeffrey Cooper
2009	Jeffrey Cohen
2008	William Freeman
2007	Elizabeth Bankert
2006	Marky Pitts

=== Special Service Award ===
The Special Service Award was given periodically from 2000 to 2005, and was intended "to recognize exemplary individuals who have made a valuable contribution to the goals of our organization and whose achievements promote the ethical conduct of research." Recipients of the Special Service Award were members or nonmembers who made short-term, but vital, contributions to our organization and/or to the field of applied research ethics for human or animal research.

2005	Dale Hammerschmidt
2003	Dan K. Nelson
2000	Gary Ellis

=== Pillars of PRIM&R ===
The Pillars of PRIM&R Memorial Fund was created in 2007 to memorialize and honor Louis Lasagna, Herman Wigodsky, and Sandford Chodosh, three former members of PRIM&R's board of directors. The Pillars of PRIM&R Memorial Fund provides awards to recognize and nurture early-career professionals who reflect PRIM&R's mission through research ethics scholarship, and potential for leadership in the field.

2010	Amal Matar	American University in Cairo, Egypt
2009	Neal Dickert	Emory University School of Medicine
2008	Dyaeldin Elsayed	Alzaiem Alazhari University in Khartoum, Sudan

== Organizational structure ==
PRIM&R's headquarters are located in Park Square in Boston, Massachusetts. PRIM&R is governed by a Board of Directors who are responsible for determining and developing policy for the organization. The 23 members of the Board supervise and direct the affairs of PRIM&R via a committee structure. PRIM&R's Board represents multiple professional disciplines and institutional settings, including biomedical research, social science/behavioral research, research subject and/or patient advocacy, pharmaceutical/biotechnology industry, health law, animal research, international research, policy development, academic research ethics, public health, and a range of related disciplines. PRIM&R employs approximately 20 individuals who coordinate and execute organizational functions ranging from conference planning and the development of new educational programs, to membership outreach and recruitment, to drafting public policy comments.

== See also ==
- Research ethics
- Human Subject Research
- Belmont Report
- Unethical human experimentation in the United States
- Clinical trial
- Informed consent
- Tuskegee syphilis experiment
- Research ethics
- Office for Human Research Protections
- Common Rule
- Guidelines for human subject research
