= Research participant =

Person who participates in human-subject research

A research participant, also called a human subject or an experiment, trial, or study participant or subject, is a person who voluntarily participates in human subject research after giving informed consent to be the subject of the research. A research participant is different from individuals who are not able to give informed consent, such as children, infants, and animals. Such individuals are preferentially referred to as subjects.

== Rights ==
In accordance with modern norms of research ethics and with the Declaration of Helsinki, researchers who conduct human subject research should afford certain rights to research participants. Research participants should expect the following:

- to be the target of beneficence
- to experience research justice
- to get respect for persons
- to have privacy for research participants
- to be informed
- to be safe from undue danger

== Terminology ==
There are several standard themes in the choice of words (participant, subject, patient, control, respondent):

- In scientific publishing, many usage commentators prefer the term participant rather than subject because the latter has a connotation to some readers of limited autonomy, as if the person were in a subservient or uninformed role. In contrast, participant connotes active consent, involvement, and awareness.
- In retrospective studies such as chart-review studies, the word participant may be a poor choice, because the persons being studied are not actively participating (and they may not even be aware of the particular study, although they have consented to the idea that their data may be included in scientific studies when sufficiently anonymized). Therefore, replacing the word subject with participant is only conditionally (not universally) appropriate. In most such studies, the word patient may be preferable to subject, as long as all of the subjects in that study were patients (see next point).
- Not all participants are patients. Some are healthy controls. In some study designs, all the participants are patients; but in others, only some of them are. Therefore, replacing the word subject with patient is only conditionally (not universally) appropriate.
- A case is an instance of disease. A patient is a person. Patients are not cases. When writing, investigators should use the words appropriately. For example, a 55-year-old patient with melanoma is not a 55-year-old case of melanoma.
  - In case-control studies especially, many instances of this distinction may arise. Although it is accepted to refer to control-group participants as controls, it is poor writing to refer to case-group participants as cases. Instead, the term case participants is used; and control participants is parallel to it.
- In survey methodology, research participants are referred to as respondent.
- In qualitative research, people who form part of the study are referred to as participants, such as focus group participants.

Social scientists have emphasized that word choice influences the way that researchers think of study participants and the respect that they have for them.

== Issues ==
Payment for research participants is a controversial topic where experts have varying views.

== History ==
In 1998 The BMJ adopted the policy of calling people "participants" rather than "subjects". The intent for this practice was to show more respect for people. Prior to this various other research organizations had considered making this switch.

== See also ==
- Patient and public involvement
