= Human medical experiments in the United States =

Human medical experiments in the United States:

- In general, see human subjects research
- Nonconsensual, see unethical human experimentation in the United States.

== See also ==
- guidelines for human subject research
- Common Rule
