= Respect for persons =

Ethical guideline

Respect for persons is the concept that all people deserve the right to fully exercise their autonomy. Showing respect for persons is a system for interaction in which one entity ensures that another has agency to be able to make a choice.

This concept is usually discussed in the context of research ethics. It is one of the three basic principles of research ethics stated in the Belmont Report issued by the Office of Human Subject Research; it comprises two essential moral requirements: to recognize the right for autonomy and to protect individuals who are disadvantaged to the extent that they cannot practice this right.

An autonomous person is defined as an individual who is capable of self-legislation and is able to make judgments and actions based on their particular set of values, preferences, and beliefs. Respecting a person's autonomy thus involves considering their choices and decisions without deliberate obstruction. It also requires that subjects be treated in a non-degrading manner out of respect for their dignity. In practice, respect for persons is operationalized by obtaining informed consent from all individuals who are going to be research subjects.

== Vulnerable populations ==
The standard case for applying respect for persons is when the person receiving the health intervention is of sound mind, fit to make personal decisions, and empowered to choose from various options. Other cases involve showing respect to people who for whatever reason are not free to choose among the typical range of options when making a decision.

In medical research ethics, the term Vulnerable Populations generally refers to individuals whose situations do not allow them to protect their own interests. The categories of individuals that constitute Vulnerable Populations are outlined under The Common Rule (45 CFR 46, Subparts A-D). These include individuals who are minors, prisoners, pregnant, physically disabled, mentally disabled, old, economically disadvantaged, educationally disadvantaged, or subordinates in hierarchical groups (e.g. a soldier).

These individuals are entitled to protection, and additional ethical justification is needed to involve such populations in human subject studies. In such cases, a balance should be established between protecting subjects from exploitation and depriving these subjects of access to the potential benefits of research.

Reasons justifying the participation of these subjects would include that some studies could not be carried out without a vulnerable population. Another justification would be that the aim of the study is to gain knowledge to improve diagnosis, prevention or treatment of diseases associated specifically with that population.

== See also ==
- Menlo Report
- Beneficence
- Justice
