= TrialMatch =

TrialMatch is a website which facilitates by matching research participants in the United States to clinical trials.

The tool was made public in 2010. The service claimed 320,000 users in 2020.

Users give their health information to the service and a mix of human an automated review generates results. The service is one of many efforts in the field of Alzheimer's disease research to recruit research participants.
