= Guidelines for human subject research =

Medical ethics guides

Various organizations have created guidelines for human subject research for various kinds of research involving human subjects and for various situations.

== Instructions for the Directors of Clinics, Outpatient Clinics and Other Medical Facilities ==
In 1892, Albert Ludwig Sigesmund Neisser, a German physician who is credited with the discovery of Neisseria gonorrhoeae, performed two sets of clinical trials attempting to find a method of prevention for syphilis. Neisser first inserted serum obtained from a single patient who had begun exhibiting the early signs of syphilis under the skin of four female patients, similar to the procedure for smallpox inoculation. Neisser did not obtain consent from these patients, but none of them developed the disease. Neisser then conducted the second set of trials on four prostitutes. This time, the serums were injected intravenously and each serum was obtained from a different syphilis patient, each at various stages of the disease. The prostitutes from the second set of trials also neither consented nor were informed of the experimentation. Unlike the first set of trials, all four of the subjects developed syphilis at varying times after the injection.

In 1898, Neisser published his results from the clinical experiments he conducted, triggering a public outcry in which Neisser was accused of “maliciously inoculating innocent children with syphilis poison.” Neisser defended his actions, arguing that the prostitutes contracted syphilis from their line of work rather than his experiments, and had the general support of academic physicians. One notable exception was the German psychiatrist Albert Moll, who believed informed consent to be necessary in human trials.

Later that year, the Royal Disciplinary Court fined Neisser, ruling that he was negligent in obtaining consent from patients. In 1899, the Prussian minister for religious, academic, and medical affairs sought advice regarding the ethicality of Neisser's experiments in response to a request from the Prussian parliament to take measures regarding the scandal, and commissioned a report from the Scientific Medical Office of Health. In 1900, the minister issued the “Instructions for the Directors of Clinics, Outpatient Clinics and Other Medical Facilities” for all medical directors regarding any medical procedure “other than for diagnosis, therapy, and immunization”.

The instructions state that medical experimentation would be prohibited if:

- the subject is a minor.
- the subject has not provided unambiguous consent.
- possible negative consequences have not been explained.
- there is no authorization from the medical director.

These instructions were not committed to law and as such were not legally binding. To this day, it remains unclear if the Prussian directive had any effect on human experimentation; however, these were still the first regulations regarding human medical experimentation in Western medicine.

== Guidelines for Human Experimentation ==
One of the earliest models for ethical human experimentation, preceding the Nuremberg Code, was established in 1931. In the Weimar Republic of 20th century pre-Nazi Germany, the entity known as Reichsgesundheitsamt (translating roughly to National Health Service), under the Ministry of the Interior formulated a list of 14 points detailing these ethical principles.

The main points of the 1931 Guidelines for Human Experimentation are as follows:

- Full unambiguous and informed consent from test subjects is required, except in extreme extenuating circumstances.
- Risks should be balanced out by potential benefits.
- Caution should be taken for subjects under 18 years old.
- Extreme caution should be taken if microorganisms are involved.
- Poor or socially disadvantaged subjects should not be exploited.
- Animal testing should be conducted first, and human experiments are to be avoided if other means of collecting data are still available.

The Guidelines were formed under the context of reforming criminal law in Germany and in partial response to public criticism of human experimentation. They also outline specific definitions for both therapeutic and non-therapeutic research in human subjects (dubbed “innovative therapy” and “scientific experimentation”), and set forth detailed boundaries for both. However, the vast majority of the physicians discussing the regulations prior to their instantiation were concerned primarily with the proper advancement of medical science rather than the protection of vulnerable patients.

The Guidelines shares similarities with the 1900 Prussian Instructions for the Directors in that both contain clauses for needing consent and for subjects who are underage. The Nuremberg Code would also later specify a requirement for informed consent, and contains other additional similarities to the Guidelines – for instance, both require risk to be balanced out by potential benefits, and both discourage the use of human experimentation if other means of obtaining the desired results are available. While the two are similar, the Guidelines contain more clauses and requirements regarding human experimentation. For example, the Guidelines also necessitate the creation of a report detailing the purpose and justification of the experiment. Ravindra Ghooi was critical of the Nuremberg Code, arguing that it bears too strong of a resemblance to the 1931 Guidelines to pass as coincidence, and that the 1931 Guidelines must have been used as reference in creating the Code. However, the Nuremberg Code does contain stipulations not found in the Guidelines – the clause requiring subjects be given the freedom to leave the experiment at any time is one such example.

The Guidelines for Human Experimentation remained in effect through the end of the Third Reich in 1945, and continued to exist in the law until 1948. Notably, Nazi human experimentation occurred under the existence of these laws.

== Nuremberg Code ==
In the early 1940s in Germany doctors conducted Nazi human experimentation on unwilling test subjects; one way of describing the procedures could be to call it medical torture. After the Allied Forces won World War II, United States authorities who held the Nuremberg Palace of Justice used that building to host the Doctors' Trial in which Nazi researchers were charged with crimes against humanity for unethical research practices. After the Subsequent Nuremberg Trials many people felt compelled to create laws to codify some research guidelines to protect research participants and define acceptable relationships between researchers and research participants.

In 1949 the Nuremberg Code was published to be a set of guidelines to guide researchers who work with human subjects. Among the points of the code are the following concepts: participants must continually give their voluntary consent, the study must have the goal of producing good for society, and considerations must be taken to protect participants from even the remote possibility of injury.

== Declaration of Helsinki ==
In 1964, the World Medical Association published a code of research ethics, the Declaration of Helsinki. It was based on the Nuremberg Code, focusing on medical research with therapeutic intent. Subsequently, medical professionals and researchers began requiring that research follows the principles outlined in the Declaration. This document was one of the milestones towards the implementation of the institutional review board (IRB) process. Many IRBs review ethical aspects of clinical researches based on the Declaration of Helsinki codes.

== Belmont Report ==
The Tuskegee syphilis experiment was an experiment begun in 1932 by the United States Public Health Service. The design of the experiment involved recruiting 400 poor black people with syphilis and tracking their health. In the 1940s penicillin was identified as standard treatment for syphilis, but the purpose of the experiment was to track long-term syphilis and researchers did not inform the participants that they could be cured. In 1972 press reported on the study to public outrage for disregard of the health of the participants. The study was influential in shaping public perceptions of research involving human subjects.

After the press exposed the study, the US Congress appointed a panel that determined that the study should be stopped immediately and that the oversight of human research was inadequate. The panel recommended that federal regulations be designed and implemented to protect human research subjects in the future. Subsequently, the National Research Act of 1974 led to the creation of the Common Rule, the National Commission for the Protection of Human Subjects of Biomedical and Behavioral Research, and the Office for Human Research Protections

All of these reactions led to the 1979 creation and publishing of the Belmont Report. This report identifies respect for persons, beneficence, and justice as ethical principles which must underlie human subject research.

== APA Ethics Code ==
The American Psychological Association (APA) has a documented ethics code pertaining to the practice of psychology and associated research. This document contains guidelines for the use of deception in research. For members of the APA, these are hard requirements levied against their membership. They are also requirements for any research project conducted, funded, or managed by the APA.

== Research funded by the United States government ==
Title 45 Code of Federal Regulations, Part 46 (45 CFR 46) is the primary set of Federal regulations regarding the protection of human subjects in research and is often referred to as the Common Rule. It defines the laws, criteria for exemption, as well as definition and formulation of institutional review boards, though some agencies have established their own implementation of this code that supersedes portions or all of 45 CFR 46. The Department of Defense uses CFR 46 but has different exemption criteria. The Food and Drug Administration also applies a modified code that is associated with research into development of any food, drug, or medical devices.

The code establishes what is required to be considered research activities, and for participants to be considered human subjects of research. The definitions are written as such to include situations where the human is the subject of the experiment, their environment is manipulated by the researchers, and data regarding their responses are collected. If the project does not meet these definitions (or there is minimal risk to participants) then the project is exempt from IRB review and the requirements of informed consent. Generally this decision is made and documented by an IRB. The common rule also provides definitions regarding whether institutions are engaged in research, interaction between investigators and subjects, what an intervention is, and what information subjects can expect to remain private.

== See also ==
- Ethics committee
- Patient and public involvement
- Three Rs (animal research)
- Common Rule
