= ICOMPARE =

US clinical trial

iCompare is a clinical trial which lengthens the shifts of first-year medical residents at about 190 teaching hospitals from 16 hours to as many as 28 hours. The trial sought to determine how increased work by physicians affected patient care and outcomes.

The study began in July 2015. Johns Hopkins University is leading the trial.

In November 2015 Public Citizen asked the Office for Human Research Protections to investigate the trial for unethical practices.
