= Sulaimon v Minister for Justice, Equality and Law Reform =

Irish Supreme Court case

- Coat of arms of Ireland
- Court: Supreme Court of Ireland
- Full case name: Faisol Oluwanifemi Sulaimon (an infant), suing by his Father and Next Friend Fatai A. Ayimla Sulaimon v Minister for Justice Equality and Law Reform [2012] IESC 63
- Decided: 21 December 2012
- Citation: [2012] IESC 63
- Transcript: https://www.bailii.org/ie/cases/IESC/2012/S63.html

Case history
- Appealed from: High Court
- Appealed to: Supreme Court

Court membership
- Judges sitting: Denham C.J., Murray J., Hardiman J., Fennelly J., O'Donnell J.

Case opinions
- The Supreme Court quashed the Minister's decision on the refusal to issue a Certificate of Nationality
- Decision by: Hardiman J.
- Concurrence: Denham C.J., Murray J., Fennelly J.

Keywords
- Citizenship; Citizenship (Acquisition of); lus soli; Minor; Residence Permit

Sulaimon v Minister for Justice, Equality and Law Reform [2012] IESC 63; was an Irish Supreme Court case which upheld a judgment of the High Court which had previously quashed the decision of the appellant in this case, the Minister for Justice and Equality on his refusal to grant a minor a Certificate of Nationality. The court held that the respondent's father met the criteria based on citizenship calculation of lawful residence in the State and therefore, was entitled to an Irish passport as an Irish citizen.

== Background ==
The respondent in this case was a minor. His father sought an Irish passport on his behalf under the Irish Nationality and Citizenship Act 1956, which addressed the entitlement to Irish citizenship of persons born to certain non-nationals. The issue was whether the infant respondent was entitled to a certificate of Irish nationality from the Minister of Justice, and where applicable, could he also obtain an Irish passport and be treated as an Irish citizen, like his father and sister.

The minor's application for a passport was based on his father having lawfully resided in the State for five years, who had received two different letters from the Office of the Minister. The first letter (dated 7 July 2005) informed him that the Minister had granted him permission to reside in the country for a period of two years from the date of the letter. The second letter (dated 7 July 2007) granted him a further three years to lawfully reside in the State. In both letters, the respondent's father was instructed to attend Garda National Immigration Bureau in order to get his passport stamped and to update his permission registration, which he did as instructed. After fulfilling the lawful residency criteria for Irish nationality, the respondent's father applied for an Irish passport for him. However, the application for the minor's passport was rejected based on a residency calculation of the applicant's father, which was believed to be 3 days short of the necessary period for the respondent to be eligible for an Irish passport.

=== Holding of the High Court ===
The High Court, by way of judicial review, found that the minor was entitled to a Certificate of Nationality on the grounds that his father had fulfilled the necessary time period. The Minister for Justice, Equality and Law Reform appealed the decision.

== Judgement of the Supreme Court ==
=== Interpretation of Statutory Provisions ===
A large part of this case dealt with ascertaining how certain statutes should be interpreted. The following sections of the Irish Nationality and Citizenship Act 2004 were considered:

- Section 4, which provides that: "...[A]n immigration officer may, on behalf of the Minister, give to a non-national a document, or place on his or her passport... an inscription, authorizing the non-national to land or be in the State...". This is referred to in the Act as a "permission."
- Section 5, which provides that: "No non-national may be in the State other than in accordance with the terms of any permission given to him or her before the passing of this Act, or a permission given under this Act after such passing, by or on behalf of the Minister."
- Section 6A, which refers to the period of lawful residence in the state.
- Section 6B(4), which provides that a period of residence shall not be reckonable for the purposes of calculating residence under Section 6A if it is in contravention of Section 5(1) of the Immigration Act 2004.

Further, the court considered section 6 of the Irish Nationality and Immigration Act 1956, which provides that: "A person born in the island of Ireland shall not be entitled to be an Irish citizen unless a parent of that person has, during the period of four years immediately preceding the person's birth, been resident in the island of Ireland for a period of not less than three years or periods the aggregate of which is not less than three years."

The court placed particular emphasis on section 4 and 5, stating that the Act clearly contemplated that at least two permissions may be identified. The first of these is the permission granted by the Minister and the second is the permission granted by an immigration officer on behalf of the Minister. The Act thus conferred a separate power on the Minister to grant the permission contained in the letters to the applicant's father, and contemplated another power through the immigration officer (agent) acting on the minister's behalf.

The word "permission" under section 5 of the Act, was interpreted to mean that a "ministerial permission" is to be regarded as being of the same nature as the permission granted under Section 4 of the Act. O'Donnell J. decided that the Act correctly recognised that the Minister does have the power to grant permission and the Act does not set out any procedure nor prescribe any particular formality on how such permission should be granted. Therefore, the letter from the Minister is the grant of permission and the Garda National Immigration Bureau's role is to provide the documents evidencing the registration of such permission.

=== Holding of the Supreme Court ===
The Supreme Court upheld the decision of the High Court, which confirmed that Mr Sulaimon's periods of residency in the State were sufficient for Naturalization purposes, despite the Garda National Immigration Bureau residency calculation gap. The Supreme Court held that the citizenship calculation of the applicant's father's permission in the state, had met the residency criteria, the logical basis for this decision, is the fact that the Minister for Justice had issued a letter to Mr Sulaimon granting him permission to remain in the state, and that Mr Sulaimon had remained as a legal resident in the state during the permitted period stated in that letter. The judges confirmed that Mr Sulaimon's first permission was operative from when he received the letter indicating that the Minister had granted him permission to reside in the state, therefore, the judges of the Supreme Court dismissed the Minister's arguments and dismissed the appeal.
