= National Research Act =

US law

- Other short titles: National Research Service Award Act of 1974
- Long title: An Act to amend the Public Health Service Act to establish a program of National Research Service Awards to assure the continued excellence of biomedical and behavioral research and to provide for the protection of human subjects involved in biomedical and behavioral research and for other purposes.
- Nicknames: National Biomedical Research Fellowship, Traineeship, and Training Act
- Enacted by: the 93rd United States Congress
- Effective: July 12, 1974

Citations
- Public law: 93-348
- Statutes at Large: 88 Stat. 342

Codification
- Titles amended: 42 U.S.C.: Public Health and Social Welfare
- U.S.C. sections amended: 42 U.S.C. ch. 6A, subch. I § 218; 42 U.S.C. ch. 6A, subch. II § 241; 42 U.S.C. ch. 6A, subch. III §§ 289l-1, 289l-3

Legislative history
- Introduced in the House as H.R. 7724 by Paul G. Rogers (D–FL) on May 10, 1973; Committee consideration by House Interstate and Foreign Commerce, Senate Labor and Public Welfare; Passed the House on May 31, 1973 (354-9); Passed the Senate on September 11, 1973 (81-6); Reported by the joint conference committee on June 24, 1974; agreed to by the Senate on June 27, 1974 (72-14) and by the House on June 28, 1974 (311-10); Signed into law by President Richard Nixon on July 12, 1974

The National Research Act is an American law enacted by the 93rd United States Congress and signed into law by President Richard Nixon on July 12, 1974. The law was passed following a series of congressional hearings on human-subjects research, directed by Senator Edward Kennedy.

The National Research Act created the National Commission for the Protection of Human Subjects of Biomedical and Behavioral Research to develop guidelines for human subject research and to oversee and regulate the use of human experimentation in medicine. The National Research Act gained traction as a response to the infamous Tuskegee syphilis study.

== Provisions ==
The National Research Act issued Title 45, Part 46 of the Code of Federal Regulations: Protection of Human Subjects (45 CFR 46). The National Research Act is overseen by the Office of Human Research Protections. The Act also formalized a regulated IRB process through local institutional review boards, also overseen by the Office of Human Research Protections.

== See also ==
- Human experimentation in the United States
- Belmont Report
- Eugenics in the United States
- Unethical human experimentation
- Human rights in the United States
- Project MKUltra
- Tuskegee syphilis experiment
