= Office for Human Research Protections =

Office within the United States Department of Health and Human Services

Office for Human Research Protections (OHRP)
Agency overview
- Formed: June 2000
- Preceding agency: Office for Protection from Research Risks
- Headquarters: 1101 Wootton Parkway, Suite 200 Rockville, MD 20852
- Parent department: United States Department of Health and Human Services
- Website: https://www.hhs.gov/ohrp/

The Office for Human Research Protections (OHRP) is a small office within the United States Department of Health and Human Services (DHHS), specifically the Office of the Assistant Secretary for Health in the Office of the Secretary of DHHS, that deals with ethical oversights in clinical research conducted by the department, mostly through the National Institutes of Health (NIH).

The office's primary duty is the implementation of 45 CFR 46, a set of regulations for Institutional Review Boards (IRBs) that mirrors the U.S. Food and Drug Administration (FDA) regulation that covers clinical research conducted by pharmaceutical companies as well as other regulations under the guidance of the Federal Policy for the Protection of Human Subjects, which is also known as the "Common Rule".

Institutions that conduct DHHS-sponsored research must have a "Federal-Wide Assurance" (FWA), an agreement with OHRP regarding ethical oversight. OHRP also provides education for IRBs, gives guidance on research ethics, and advises the HHS Secretary on issues of medical ethics.

== History ==
=== Human experimentation prior to the OHRP ===
Unethical human experimentation in the United States has been practiced in the United States for a long time prior to creation of the OHRP. A major characteristic of experimentation done during this time was the disregard for suffering inflicted on patients. In the 1840s, J. Marion Sims performed hundreds of surgical operations on enslaved African women without using anesthesia. Robert Bartholow applied electric currents into the exposed brain matter of patients. One egregious example was in 1874 when a lady came in for treatment of a cancerous ulcer on her skull that made a 2-inch hole. Bartholow inserted electrodes into her brain and caused her great distress. The lady went into a coma and died 4 days later. Another theme of human experimentation in the 19th and early 20th century was the unjust treatment of ethnic minority patients. At the turn of the 20th century, US Army doctors infected 34 Filipino prisoners with bubonic plague and beriberi. Between 1932 and 1972, the Tuskegee syphilis experiment observed the natural progression of syphilis in 600 African American males (399 of which had syphilis and 201 control subjects who did not have syphilis). In exchange for their participation, the men were promised free medical exams, hot meals and a burial fund. The men were never told that they had syphilis nor were they provided treatment when penicillin became available as an effective cure in 1947. By the end of the study in 1972, only 74 of the test subjects were alive. Of the original 399 men with syphilis, 28 had died of the disease, 100 had died of syphilis-related complications. Additionally, 40 wives had been infected and 19 children had been born with congenital syphilis. A common misconception of the Tuskegee Syphilis Experiment is that subjects were injected with syphilis.

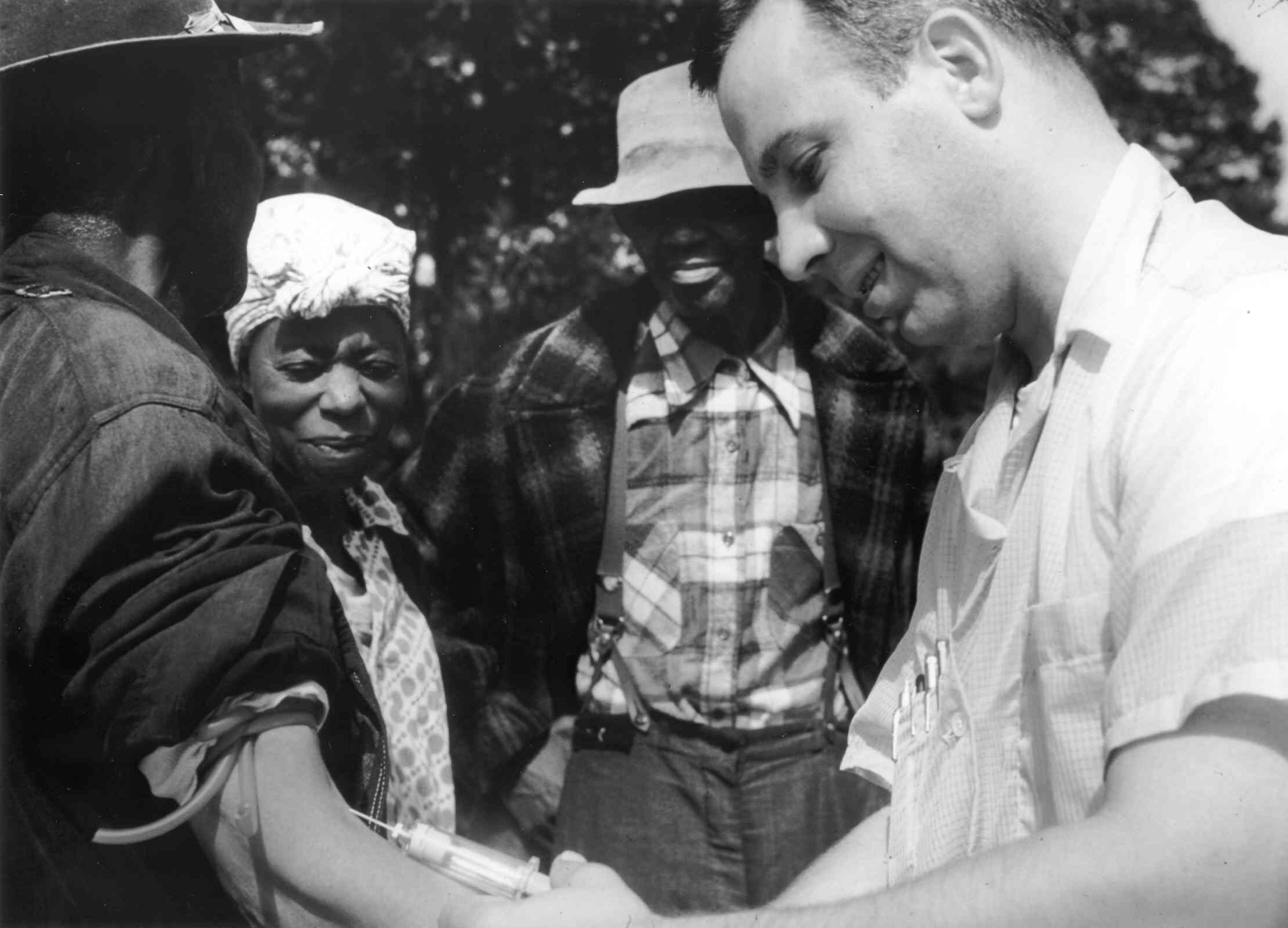
Taking a blood sample as part of the Tuskegee Syphilis Study

=== Notable precursory research ethics entities ===
Before the founding of the OHRP, the United States went through several precursory entities whose goals were to handle ethics in human experimentation. Many were transitory committees that lasted no more than a year or two, such as the Advisory Committee on Human Radiation Experiments and the Ethics Advisory Board. One of the early and longstanding groups concerned with experimental subject safety was the American Psychological Association (APA), who first published their "Ethical standards of psychologists" in 1953. The APA has since published many versions of their Ethics Code and currently operate under the code passed in 2002 The National Research Act then established the National Commission for the Protection of Human Subjects of Biomedical and Behavioral Research, which was the first national commission whose entire focus was the protection of experimental subjects. In 1978, the Food and Drug Administration added their first regulations protecting human research subjects, which were revised in 1981. The National Bioethics Advisory Commission was signed into existence by President Bill Clinton in October 1995 and was terminated in October 2001.

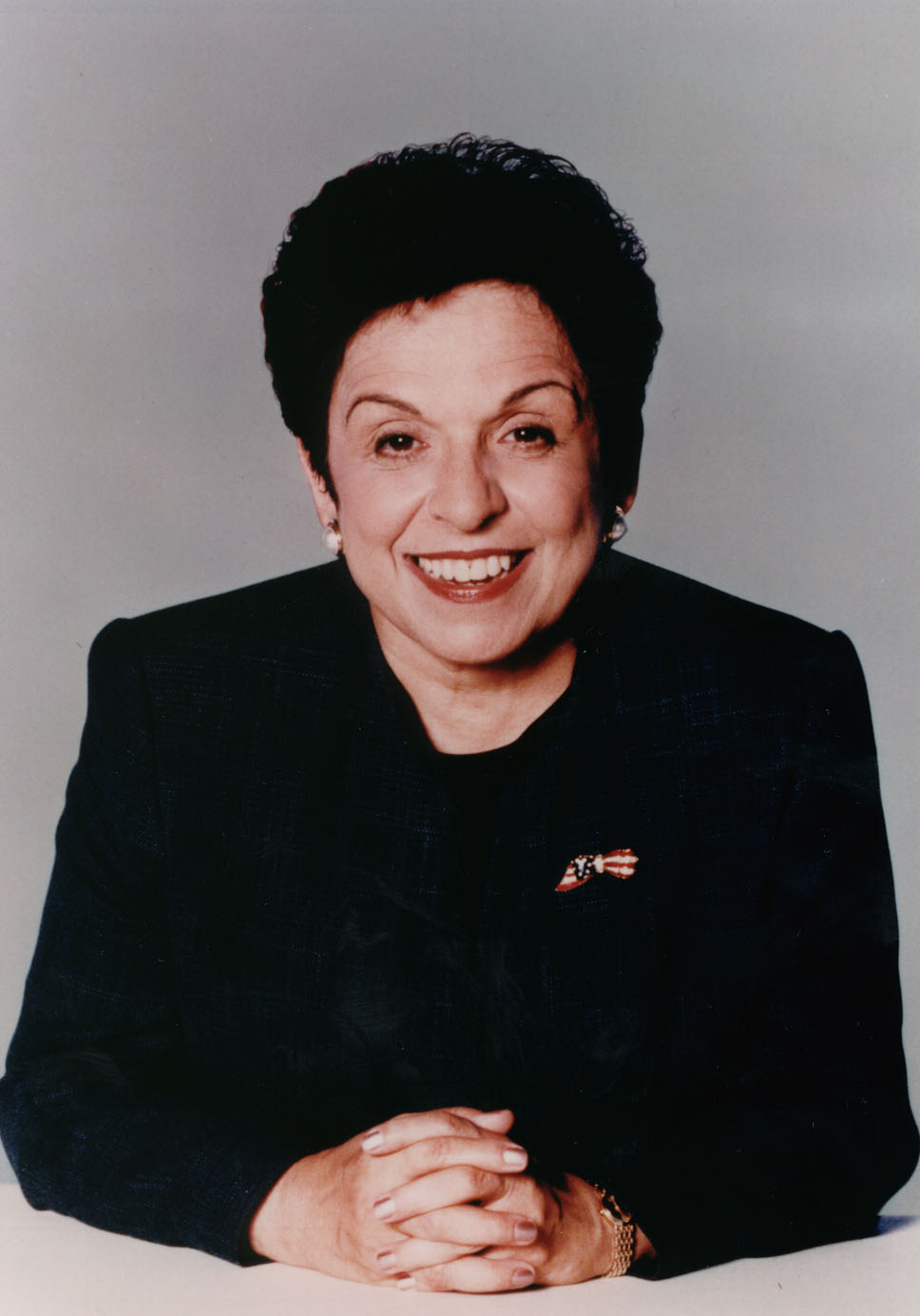
Donna Shalala during her term as a Secretary of Health and Human Services.

=== Founding ===
On June 13, 2000, the United States Secretary of Health and Human Services, Donna Shalala, created the OHRP as a component of the Office of Public Health and Science, with the main function of overseeing research done on human test subjects and ensuring its compliance with regulations set forth by the United States Department of Health and Human Services. The OHRP replaced the Office for Protection from Research Risks, and Greg Koski was named as the first director. The director of the OHRP was to report to the United States Assistant Secretary for Health under the Department of Health and Human Services (then David Satcher).

=== Case involvement ===
Since its founding, the OHRP has interfered in several cases involving human subject research experiments in which violations were made to the health and rights of the participants, as well as the regulations put in place for human research. In 2001, the OHRP temporarily suspended the research license of Johns Hopkins University and its associated research facilities following the death of a participant in a hexamethonium inhalation experiment. The experiment was found to be violating regulations in that the researchers failed to inform the participants of the possible dangers of hexamethonium as well as obtain proper information on the effect of hexamethonium prior to experimentation. In another case that occurred in 2013, the OHRP challenged the practice of the Surfactant, Positive Pressure, and Oxygenation Randomized Trial (SUPPORT), a research project in which 1300 premature infants were used as subjects to test the optimum levels of oxygenation to be used for proper care of premature infants in hospitals. This experiment was determined to be in violation of federal regulations in that the parents of these infants were not informed of the possible effects of the experiment on their child, which included blindness or death, and were therefore unable to give informed consent.

== Organizational structure ==
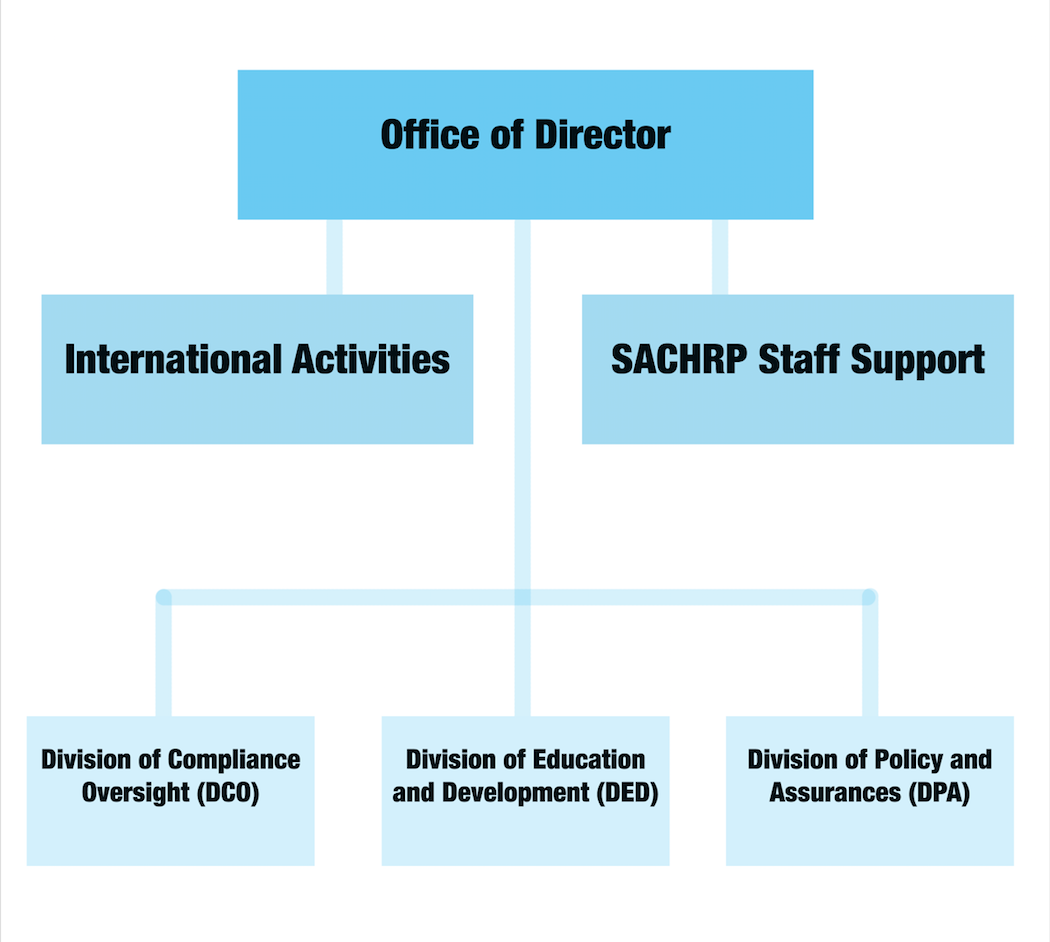
Diagram of the Office of Human Research Protections' organizational structure

=== Office of the Director ===
As a leader in the DHHS, the Office of the Director oversees all functions of the OHRP and works closely with DHHS officials including the Secretary of Health and Human Services and the Assistant Secretary for Health to ensure that human research policies, plans, and procedures meet ethical standards. The committees that fall under the Office of the Director include International Activities and the Secretary's Advisory Committee on Human Research Protections (SACHRP).

==== Secretary's Advisory Committee on Human Research Protections (SACHRP) ====
A committee within the Office of the Director, the SACHRP consists of mainly researchers and lawyers who aid the Secretary of Health and Human Services with their expert advice. The Assistant Secretary for Health acts as a middleman presenting the committee's advice to the secretary for consideration. In addition, the SACHRP also holds three annual meetings which are open for public audience and questions.

==== International activities ====
This committee works to enhance ethical policies and procedures that protect human research subjects around the world. These global efforts ensure that the people who participate in any research funded and or conducted by the DHHS are given protection equal to those participating in the United States.

=== Division of Compliance Oversight ===
The Division of Compliance Oversight is in charge of evaluating substantive noncompliance reports based on the Health and Human Services (HHS) regulations. Based on written investigation reports, the office determines whether regulatory actions will be needed to protect the human research subjects. Both for-cause compliance and not-for cause surveillance evaluations are conducted.

=== Division of Education and Development (DED) ===
The DED is responsible for much of OHRP's publicity. Its tasks include hosting events, advising researchers involved in affiliated experiments, and propagating educational materials about human research subject protections. Education materials are also presented online via the official OHRP website.

=== Division of Policy and Assurances ===
The Division of Policy and Assurances prepares the policies, guidelines, and requirements for human subject protection and provides the information to the research community. It is also in charge of the administration of the Federal-wide Assurances of Compliance and registration of institutional review boards.

== Responsibilities ==
=== Belmont Report ===
The Office for Human Research Protections adheres to the principles of the Belmont Report in order to carry out its responsibilities. The Belmont Report is a set of guidelines created by the National Commission for the Protection of Human Subjects of Biomedical and Behavioral Research. Intended to serve as ethical parameters for those conducting research involving human subjects, the Belmont Report has three main aspects: boundaries between practice and research, basic ethical principles, and application of these principles.

There is major difference between regulations for practice of approved procedures and research. As such, the Belmont Report defines each term in order to help determine what constitutes what. Practice is defined as an established methodology designed to improve an individual's condition with confidence for success. Research is defined as a procedure designed to test a hypothesis and draw conclusions in an experimental style. The OHRP only reviews activity categorized as research.

The three basic ethical principles outlined in the Belmont Report are respect for persons, beneficence, and justice. Respect for persons incorporates emphasis on the subjects and their autonomy, meaning their ability to make decisions in the research. To have autonomy, subjects must give informed consent. This means they must be mature enough to and mentally capable of self-determination, must fully understand their role in the procedures, and must be completely voluntary to participate. Beneficence requires that the research have intentions to produce benefits, or potential for benefits, for the individual or others with similar conditions that outweigh any risk that may be involved. Justice delineates a need for fair distribution in the selection of subjects, meaning bias in participants is minimized. Participants cannot be all from a vulnerable or easily accessible population without violating the justice principle.

=== 45 C.F.R. 46 ===
==== Basic HHS policy for protection of human research subjects ====
Subpart A, more commonly known as the "Common Rule", of 45 C.F.R. 46 is the fundamental guidelines for ethics of all human research. Any establishment that wants to do research involving humans must submit a document that states they will comply with this policy and all pertinent policies to the federal department or agency with authority. The institutional review board (IRB) must initially review and approve the research and in the case the study is approved, the IRB will then continue to monitor the research. If at any point the research does not follow the guidelines approved by the IRB, then the IRB has the authority to suspend or terminate the research. The department or agency in charge also has the power to suspend the research. During the course of the study, the IRB must document all meetings and activities.

The guidelines that a research study must follow before being approved involves informed consent of the subjects, minimal risk to the subjects, and no abuse of "vulnerable subjects". Informed consent must include all aspects of the research, which include the overall premise, risks, benefits, alternative procedures, confidentiality, and any compensations that may be available. The subject must officially state that they voluntarily choose to participate in the experiment under all the circumstances provided by the establishment. This informed consent is documented by the IRB and signed by the test subject.

==== Additional protection for pregnant women, human fetuses, and neonates ====
The U.S. Department of Health and Human Services sets required conditions for any research is done on pregnant women or fetuses.

For research on pregnant women and fetuses, condition topics include preclinical risk studies, minimizing risk, no money (or other benefits) given to terminate pregnancy, direct potential benefit to pregnant women and fetuses (otherwise special consent provisions are required), pregnant children (requires special consent provisions), and research participants inability to choose neither how a pregnancy is terminated nor if a neonate (an infant under 4 weeks old) is viable.

For research specifically on neonates, regulations differ based on whether the infant has certain viability, certain unviability, or uncertain viability. For uncertain viability, research must maximize the probability of viability and abide by parental consent provisions. For non-viable neonates, the research cannot terminate heartbeat or respiration, nor can they artificially maintain vital functions; there can be no risk added to the neonate, and parental consent is required. Viable neonates have a consent procedure.

There are also specific conditions for research involving post-delivery placenta, dead fetus, or fetal material. These require studies to comply with federal, state, and local laws. In addition, if individuals from the research can be in any way identified, those individuals are research subjects and must be treated with all necessary legal requirements.

If a study cannot be approved by these conditions but offers great potential for the health of pregnant women, fetuses, or neonates, there is a special process by which The Secretary may or may not approve the study; this process involves consultation with a panel of experts, as well as ethical and consent codes.

==== Additional protection for prisoners ====
The Guidance on Involvement of Prisoners in Research provides protection to prisoners. Prisoners can be involved in biomedical or behavioral research if and only if the research is specifically authorized. "Prisoner" is defined by HHS regulations at 45 CFR part 46.303(c) as "any individual involuntarily confined or detained in a penal institution. The term is intended to encompass individuals sentenced to such an institution under a criminal or civil statute, individuals detained in other facilities by virtue of statutes or commitment procedures which provide alternatives to criminal prosecution or incarceration in a penal institution, and individuals detained pending arraignment, trial, or sentencing." It also applies to the situation where a person becomes a prisoner after the research has started.

The subpart B points out that if a prisoner's ability of giving consent is affected, i.e., this prisoner's decision is not truly voluntary and uncoerced, then additional safeguards should be provided for the purpose of safety. In addition, the members of the IRB should (1) generally have no association with the prison(s) involved, and (2) have at least one of them to be a prisoner. In general, the protection for prisoners is similar to the ones for other minority groups, and the research itself should receive permission from OHRP.

==== Additional protection for children ====
In the case of human research, "'Children' are persons who have not attained the legal age for consent to treatments or procedures involved in the research, under the applicable law of the jurisdiction in which the research will be conducted." For the most part, the protections for minors are mostly the same as they are for any other human subject. However, Subpart D of 45 CFR 46 marks several distinctions about obtaining consent/assent and the nature of the research involving children. According to the actual rules of informed consent given by the IRB for the research in question, child assent and parental consent may both be required to conduct research on minors. Depending on IRB regulations, should either party fail to give their assent, then research may not be conducted on the child.

In general, research may only be done on children if it will offer no significant risk to the child. This rule may be circumvented if the child stands to gain a direct benefit to his/her health even if the procedure may have greater than minimal risk. Even if there is no direct benefit to the minor and there may be greater than minimal risk, the IRB may approve the research if generalized knowledge about the subject’s condition or if knowledge pertaining to the health of children may come out of research on the child.

==== Registration of IRB ====
An institutional review board (IRB) is a type of committee that reviews human based bio-research. Under 45 C.F.R 46, each IRB that is designated by an institution must be registered with the Office for Human Research Protections (OHRP) of the Department of Health and Human Services (HHS). When registering an IRB, the following information must be provided to OHRP: the information of the institution, including its name and mailing address, the personal information of the person in charge of the IRB, the estimated number of active protocols that the IRB has conducted an initial review or is going to conduct a review, and the number of full-time positions of the IRB. All the registration process must be done electronically through the official website of OHRP. After registration, all the information provided will be reviewed by OHRP. The IRB will remain effective for three years after being officially approved and accepted. The information must be renewed for every three years. In addition, should there be any change of the chairperson's information, an update must be submitted to OHRP within 90 days. If the institution or organization decides to disband a currently operating and functioning IRB, a report must be sent to OHRP within 30 days.

== See also ==
- Human experimentation in the United States
- Institutional review board
- Medical ethics
- Declaration of Helsinki
