= Albert R. Jonsen =

American bioethicist (1931–2020)

23rd President of the University of San Francisco
- In office 1969–1972
- Preceded by: Charles W. Dullea, S.J.
- Succeeded by: William C. McInnes, S.J.

Personal details
- Born: April 1931 San Francisco, California, U.S.
- Died: October 21, 2020 (aged 89)
- Spouse: Liz
- Education: Yale University

Albert R. Jonsen (April 1931 – October 21, 2020) was and American academic administrator, educator, and one of the founders of the field of bioethics. He was president of the University of San Francisco. He was emeritus professor of ethics in medicine at the University of Washington School of Medicine, where he was chairman of the Department of Medical History and Ethics from 1987 to 1999. After retiring from UW, he returned to San Francisco, where he co-founded the Program in Medicine and Human Values at Sutter Health's California Pacific Medical Center in 2003.

== Early life and education ==
Jonsen was born in April 1931 in San Francisco. He had two brothers, Robert and Richard, and a sister, Anne Marie. In 1949 he joined the Society of Jesus (Jesuits) and was ordained a Roman Catholic priest in 1962. He received a doctorate in religious studies from Yale University in 1967. He resigned from the active priesthood in 1976.

== Career ==
In 1969, he was chosen as president of the University of San Francisco where he served until 1972. The medical school of the University of California, San Francisco invited him to join the faculty and create a program in medical ethics.

Jonsen was one of the first bioethicists to be appointed to a medical faculty. The National Heart, Lung and Blood Institute selected him as a member of the first NIH committee to deal with ethical, social and legal issues of a developing medical technology, the totally implantable artificial heart (1972–73).

Jonsen was a member of the National Commission for the Protection of Human Subjects of Biomedical and Behavioral Research (1974–78), charged with formulating regulations governing the use of humans in research. He participated in development of regulations regarding use of the human fetus, children and mentally incapacitated persons as research subjects; he also assisted in the writing of the Belmont Report (1978), the statement of ethical principles, a leading statement on research ethics.

In 1979, Jonsen was appointed to the successor body, the President's Commission on the Study of Ethical Problems in Medicine (1979–82) which devised reports on brain death, forgoing life-support, informed consent and other topics which have become the main subjects of bioethics.

Jonsen was a pioneer in the practice of "clinical ethics", in which an ethicist serves as a consultant to those making ethical decisions about appropriate care of patients. In 1983, Jonsen authored with Mark Siegler and William Winslade 'Clinical Ethics: A Practical Approach to Ethical Decisions in Clinical Medicine', a seminal book that provides a unique structured approach to solving ethical issues that arise in daily clinical practice.

Jonsen joined John Fletcher as founders of the Society for Clinical Ethics (SBC), which later merged with the Society for Health and Human Values (SHHV) and the American Association of Bioethics (AAB) to form the American Society for Bioethics and Humanities (ASBH) in 1998.

In 1987, Jonsen assumed the chairmanship of the Department of Medical History and Ethics, School of Medicine, University of Washington. He remained there until his retirement in 1999.

== Later life ==
After his retirement from UW, Jonsen returned to his native San Francisco, where he joined his good friend and colleague, William Andereck in co-founding The Program in Medicine and Human Values at Sutter Health's California Pacific Medical Center in 2003. At Sutter Health's Bioethics Program, he continued his scholarly work and conducted multiple research studies and authored several books and papers. He also mentored Bioethicists and Clinical Ethics Fellows during this time. At the time of his death, Jonsen had completed work on the 9th edition of his book, Clinical Ethics, with co-authors Mark Siegler, William Winslade, and Associate Editor, Ruchika Mishra.

== Personal life and death ==
In 1976, Jonsen resigned from the active priesthood to marry.

Jonsen died on October 21, 2020, at the age of 89, survived by his wife Liz of 44 years.

== Service ==
Jonsen was a fellow of the Hastings Center, an independent bioethics research institution. He served on the National Board of Medical Examiners, the American Board of Medical Specialties, the ethics committee of the American College of Obstetrics and Gynecology, and as consultant to the American Board of Internal Medicine. He was president of the Society for Health and Human Values and chair of the committee to Monitor the Social Impact of AIDS of the National Academy of Sciences. In 1981, he was elected to the Institute of Medicine, National Academy of Sciences. In 2017, The Hastings Center granted Jonsen the most prestigious honor in the field of bioethics, the Henry Knowles Beecher Award for Contributions to Ethics and the Life Sciences.

== Bibliography ==
- The Ethics of Neonatal Intensive Care (1976)
- Clinical Ethics (1982) (with Mark Siegler and William Winslade)
- The Abuse of Casuistry: A History of Moral Reasoning (1988) (with Stephen Toulmin)
- The Birth of Bioethics (1998)
- A Short History of Medical Ethics (2000)
- Bioethics Beyond the Headlines: Who Lives? Who Dies? Who Decides? (2005)
