= Respondent =

Reacting person in a lawsuit/court case or a research participant

A respondent is a person who is called upon to issue a response to a communication made by another. The term is used in legal contexts, in survey methodology, and in psychological conditioning.

== Legal usage ==
In legal usage, this term specifically refers to the defendant in a legal proceeding commenced by a petitioner, and also to an appellee, or the opposing party, in an appeal from a decision by an initial fact-finder or tribunal. For example in a Court of Appeal case, the respondents are the party facing the appellant, who is challenging a lower court decision or some aspect of it. The respondent may have been the "claimant" or the "defendant" in the lower court.

In the United States Senate, the two sides in an impeachment trial are called the management and the respondent.

== Psychology usage ==
In psychology, respondent conditioning is a synonym for classical conditioning or Pavlovian conditioning. Respondent behavior specifically refers to the behavior consistently elicited by a reflexive or classically conditioned stimulus.

== Survey usage ==
In population survey and questionnaire pretesting, a respondent is a research participant replying with answers or feedback to a survey. Depending on the survey questions and context, respondent answers may represent themselves as individuals, a household or organization of which they are a part, or as a proxy to another individual.

== Other usages ==
In non-legal or informal usage, the term refers to one who refutes or responds to a thesis or an argument. In cross-cultural communication, the second person responding to the meaning or message from an original source which has been contextualised or decoded for the understanding of respondents as recipients or hearers of the message occurring from a different cultural context.
