= Risk–benefit ratio =

Analysis of the risks and potential benefits of an action

A risk–benefit ratio (or benefit-risk ratio) is the ratio of the risk of an action to its potential benefits. Risk–benefit analysis (or benefit-risk analysis) is analysis that seeks to quantify the risk and benefits and hence their ratio.

Analyzing a risk can be heavily dependent on the human factor. A certain level of risk in our lives is accepted as necessary to achieve certain benefits. For example, driving an automobile is a risk many people take daily, but it is mitigated by the perception of their ability to manage the risky situation. When individuals are exposed to involuntary risk (a risk over which they have no control), they make risk aversion their primary goal. Under these circumstances, individuals require the probability of risk to be as much as one thousand times smaller than for the same situation under their perceived control (a notable example being the common bias in the perception of risk in flying vs. driving).

== Evaluations ==
Evaluations of future risk can be:

- Real future risk, as disclosed by the fully matured future circumstances when they develop.
- Statistical risk, as determined by currently available data, as measured actuarially for insurance premiums.
- Projected risk, as analytically based on system models structured from historical studies.
- Perceived risk, as intuitively seen by individuals.

== Medical research ==
For research that involves more than minimal risk of harm to the subjects, the investigator must assure that the amount of benefit clearly outweighs the amount of risk. A study may only be considered ethical if there is a favorable risk–benefit ratio.

The Declaration of Helsinki, adopted by the World Medical Association, states that biomedical research cannot be done legitimately unless the importance of the objective is in proportion to the risk to the subject. The Helsinki Declaration and the CONSORT Statement stress a favorable risk–benefit ratio.

== See also ==
- Benefit shortfall
- Cost–benefit analysis
- Odds algorithm
- Optimism bias
- Reference class forecasting
