= Title 45 of the Code of Federal Regulations =

U.S. federal rules and regulations on public welfare

CFR Title 45 - Public Welfare is one of fifty titles comprising the United States Code of Federal Regulations (CFR). Title 45 is the principal set of rules and regulations issued by federal agencies of the United States regarding public welfare. Section 46 regards the protection of human subjects.

== Structure ==
The table of contents, as reflected in the e-CFR updated February 18, 2014, is as follows:

Volume	Chapter	Parts	Regulatory Entity
1	I	1-199	Subtitle A--Department of Health and Human Services
2	II	200-299	Office of Family Assistance (Assistance Programs), Administration for Children and Families, Department of Health and Human Services
	III	300-399	Office of Child Support Enforcement (Child Support Enforcement Program), Administration for Children and Families, Department of Health and Human Services
	IV	400-499	Office of Refugee Resettlement, Administration for Children and Families, Department of Health and Human Services
3	V	500-599	Foreign Claims Settlement Commission of the United States, Department of Justice
	VI	600-699	National Science Foundation
	VII	700-799	Commission on Civil Rights
	VIII	800-899	Office of Personnel Management
	X	1000-1099	Office of Community Services, Administration for Children and Families, Department of Health and Human Services
	XI	1100-1199	National Foundation on the Arts and the Humanities
4	XII	1200-1299	Corporation for National and Community Service
	XIII	1300-1399	Office of Human Development Services, Department of Health and Human Services
	XVI	1600-1699	Legal Services Corporation
	XVII	1700-1799	National Commission on Libraries and Information Science
	XVIII	1800-1899	Harry S. Truman Scholarship Foundation
	XXI	2100-2199	Commission on Fine Arts
	XXIII	2300-2399	Arctic Research Commission
	XXIV	2400-2499	James Madison Memorial Fellowship Foundation
	XXV	2500-2599	Corporation for National and Community Service
