= Declaration of Helsinki =

Document outlining the ethics of human medical experimentation

The Declaration of Helsinki (DoH, Finnish: Helsingin julistus) is a set of ethical principles regarding human experimentation developed originally in 1964 for the medical community by the World Medical Association (WMA). It is widely regarded as the cornerstone document on human research ethics.

It is not a legally binding instrument under international law, but instead draws its authority from the degree to which it has been codified in, or influenced, national or regional legislation and regulations. Its role was described by a Brazilian forum in 2000 in these words: "Even though the Declaration of Helsinki is the responsibility of the World Medical Association, the document should be considered the property of all humanity."

== Principles ==
The Declaration is morally binding on physicians, and that obligation overrides any national or local laws or regulations, if the Declaration provides for a higher standard of protection of humans than the latter. Investigators still have to abide by local legislation but will be held to the higher standard.

=== Basic principles ===
The fundamental principle is respect for the individual (Article 8), his or her right to self-determination and the right to make informed decisions (Articles 20, 21 and 22) regarding participation in research, both initially and during the course of the research. The investigator's duty is solely to the patient (Articles 2, 3 and 10) or volunteer (Articles 16, 18), and while there is always a need for research (Article 6), the participant's welfare must always take precedence over the interests of science and society (Article 5), and ethical considerations must always take precedence over laws and regulations (Article 9).

The recognition of the increased vulnerability of individuals and groups calls for special vigilance (Article 8). It is recognized that when the research participant is incompetent, physically or mentally incapable of giving consent, or is a minor (Articles 23, 24), then allowance should be considered for surrogate consent by an individual acting in the participant's best interest, although his or her consent should still be obtained if at all possible (Article 25).

=== Operational principles ===
Research should be based on a thorough knowledge of the scientific background (Article 11), a careful assessment of risks and benefits (Articles 16, 17), have a reasonable likelihood of benefit to the population studied (Article 19) and be conducted by suitably trained investigators (Article 15) using approved protocols, subject to independent ethical review and oversight by a properly convened committee (Article 13). The protocol should address the ethical issues and indicate that it is in compliance with the Declaration (Article 14). Studies should be discontinued if the available information indicates that the original considerations are no longer satisfied (Article 17). Information regarding the study should be publicly available (Article 16). Ethical principles extend to publication of the results and consideration of any potential conflict of interest (Article 27). Experimental investigations should always be compared against the best methods, but under certain circumstances a placebo or no treatment group may be utilized (Article 29). The interests of the participant after the study is completed should be part of the overall ethical assessment, including assuring their access to the best proven care (Article 30). Wherever possible unproven methods should be tested in the context of research where there is reasonable belief of possible benefit (Article 32).

=== Additional guidelines or regulations ===
Investigators often find themselves in the position of having to follow several different codes or guidelines, and are therefore required to understand the differences between them. One of these is Good Clinical Practice (GCP), an international guide, while each country may also have local regulations such as the Common Rule in the US, in addition to the requirements of the FDA and Office for Human Research Protections (OHRP) in that country. There are a number of available tools which compare these. Other countries have guides with similar roles, such as the Tri-Council Policy Statement in Canada. Additional international guidelines include those of the CIOMS, Nuffield Council and UNESCO.

== History ==
The Declaration was originally adopted in June 1964 in Helsinki, Finland, and has since undergone eight revisions (the most recent at the General Assembly in October 2024) and two clarifications, growing considerably in length from 11 paragraphs in 1964 to 37 in the 2024 version. The Declaration is an important document in the history of research ethics as it is the first significant effort of the medical community to regulate research itself, and forms the basis of most subsequent documents.

Prior to the 1947 Nuremberg Code there was no generally accepted code of conduct governing the ethical aspects of human research, although some countries, notably Germany and Russia, had national policies. The Declaration developed the ten principles first stated in the Nuremberg Code, and tied them to the Declaration of Geneva (1948), a statement of physicians' ethical duties. The Declaration more specifically addressed clinical research, reflecting changes in medical practice from the term 'Human Experimentation' used in the Nuremberg Code. A notable change from the Nuremberg Code was a relaxation of the conditions of consent, which was 'absolutely essential' under Nuremberg. Now doctors were asked to obtain consent 'if at all possible' and research was allowed without consent where a proxy consent, such as a legal guardian, was available (Article II.1).

=== First revision (1975) ===
The 1975 revision was almost twice the length of the original. It clearly stated that "concern for the interests of the subject must always prevail over the interests of science and society." It also introduced the concept of oversight by an 'independent committee' (Article I.2) which became a system of Institutional Review Boards (IRB) in the US, and research ethics committees or ethical review boards in other countries. In the United States regulations governing IRBs came into effect in 1981 and are now encapsulated in the Common Rule. Informed consent was developed further, made more prescriptive and partly moved from 'Medical Research Combined with Professional Care' into the first section (Basic Principles), with the burden of proof for not requiring consent being placed on the investigator to justify to the committee. 'Legal guardian' was replaced with 'responsible relative'. The duty to the individual was given primacy over that to society (Article I.5), and concepts of publication ethics were introduced (Article I.8). Any experimental manoeuvre was to be compared to the best available care as a comparator (Article II.2), and access to such care was assured (Article I.3). The document was also made gender neutral.

=== Second to fourth revisions (1975–2000) ===
Subsequent revisions between 1975 and 2000 were relatively minor, so the 1975 version was effectively that which governed research over a quarter of a century of relative stability.

==== Second and third revisions (1983, 1989) ====
The second revision (1983) included seeking the consent of minors where possible. The third revision (1989) dealt further with the function and structure of the independent committee. However, from 1993 onwards, the Declaration was not alone as a universal guide since CIOMS and the World Health Organization (WHO) had also developed their International Ethical Guidelines for Biomedical Research Involving Human Subjects.

==== Fourth revision (1996) ====
===== Background =====
The AIDS Clinical Trials Group (ACTG) Study 076 of 100 Zidovudine in maternal-infant transmission of HIV had been published in 1994. This was a placebo controlled trial which showed a reduction of nearly 70% in the risk of transmission, and Zidovudine became a de facto standard of care. The subsequent initiation of further placebo controlled trials carried out in developing countries and funded by the United States Centers for Disease Control or National Institutes of Health raised considerable concern when it was learned that patients in trials in the US had essentially unrestricted access to the drug, while those in developing countries did not. Justification was provided by a 1994 WHO group in Geneva which concluded "Placebo-controlled trials offer the best option for a rapid and scientifically valid assessment of alternative antiretroviral drug regimens to prevent transmission of HIV". These trials appeared to be in direct conflict with recently published guidelines for international research by CIOMS, which stated "The ethical standards applied should be no less exacting than they would be in the case of research carried out in country", referring to the sponsoring or initiating country. In fact a schism between ethical universalism and ethical pluralism was already apparent before the 1993 revision of the CIOMS guidelines.

===== Fourth revision =====
In retrospect, this was one of the most significant revisions because it added the phrase "This does not exclude the use of inert placebo in studies where no proven diagnostic or therapeutic method exists" to Article II.3 ("In any medical study, every patient--including those of a control group, if any—should be assured of the best proven diagnostic and therapeutic method."). Critics claimed that the Zidovudine trials in developing countries were in breach of this because Zidovudine was now the best proven treatment and the placebo group should have been given it. This led to the US Food and Drug Administration (FDA) ignoring this and all subsequent revisions.

=== Fifth revision (2000) ===
==== Background ====
Following the fourth revision in 1996 pressure began to build almost immediately for a more fundamental approach to revising the declaration. The later revision in 2000 would go on to require monitoring of scientific research on human subjects to assure ethical standards were being met. In 1997 Lurie and Wolfe published their seminal paper on HIV trials, raising awareness of a number of central issues. These included the claims that the continuing trials in developing countries were unethical, and pointing out a fundamental discrepancy in decisions to change the study design in Thailand but not Africa. The issue of the use of placebo in turn raised questions about the standard of care in developing counties and whether, as Marcia Angell wrote "Human subjects in any part of the world should be protected by an irreducible set of ethical standards" (1988). The American Medical Association put forward a proposed revision in November that year, and a proposed revision (17.C/Rev1/99) was circulated the following year, causing considerable debate and resulting in a number of symposia and conferences. Recommendations included limiting the document to basic guiding principles. Many editorials and commentaries were published reflecting a variety of views including concerns that the Declaration was being weakened by a shift towards efficiency-based and utilitarian standards (Rothman, Michaels and Baum 2000), and an entire issue of the Bulletin of Medical Ethics was devoted to the debate. Others saw it as an example of Angell's 'Ethical Imperialism', an imposition of US needs on the developing world, and resisted any but the most minor changes, or even a partitioned document with firm principles and commentaries, as used by CIOMS. The idea of ethical imperialism was brought into high attention with HIV testing, as it was strongly debated from 1996 to 2000 because of its centrality to the issue of regimens to prevent its vertical transmission. Brennan summarises this by stating "The principles exemplified by the current Declaration of Helsinki represent a delicate compromise that we should modify only after careful deliberation". Nevertheless, what had started as a controversy over a specific series of trials and their designs in Sub-Saharan Africa, now had potential implications for all research. These implications further came into public view since the Helsinki declaration had stated, "In the treatment of the sick person, the physician must be free to use a new diagnostic and therapeutic measure, if in his or her judgement, it offers hope of saving life, reestablishing health or alleviating suffering."

==== Fifth revision ====
Even though most meetings about the proposed revisions failed to achieve consensus, and many argued that the declaration should remain unchanged or only minimally altered, after extensive consultation the Workgroup eventually came up with a text what that was endorsed by WMA's Council and passed by the General Assembly on October 7, 2000, and which proved to be the most far reaching and contentious revision to date. The justification for this was partly to take account of expanded scope of biomedical research since 1975. This involved a restructuring of the document, including renumbering and re-ordering of all the articles, the changes in which are outlined in this Table. The Introduction establishes the rights of subjects and describes the inherent tension between the need for research to improve the common good, and the rights of the individual. The Basic Principles establish a guide for judging to what extent proposed research meets the expected ethical standards. The distinction between therapeutic and non-therapeutic research introduced in the original document, criticised by Levine was removed to emphasize the more general application of ethical principles, but the application of the principles to healthy volunteers is spelt out in Articles 18–9, and they are referred to in Article 8 ('those who will not benefit personally from the research') as being especially vulnerable. The scope of ethical review was increased to include human tissue and data (Article 1), the necessity to challenge accepted care was added (Article 6), as well as establishing the primacy of the ethical requirements over laws and regulations (Article 9).

Amongst the many changes was an increased emphasis on the need to benefit the communities in which research is undertaken, and to draw attention to the ethical problems of experimenting on those who would not benefit from the research, such as developing countries in which innovative medications would not be available. Article 19 first introduces the concept of social justice, and extends the scope from individuals to the community as a whole by stating that 'research is only justified if there is a reasonable likelihood that the populations in which the research is carried out stand to benefit from the results of the research'. This new role for the Declaration has been both denounced and praised, Macklin R. Future challenges for the Declaration of Helsinki: Maintaining credibility in the face of ethical controversies. Address to Scientific Session, World Medical Association General Assembly, September 2003, Helsinki and even considered for a clarification footnote. Article 27 expanded the concept of publication ethics, adding the necessity to disclose conflict of interest (echoed in Articles 13 and 22), and to include publication bias amongst ethically problematic behavior.

===== Additional principles =====
The most controversial revisions (Articles 29, 30) were placed in this new category. These predictably were those that like the fourth revision were related to the ongoing debate in international health research. The discussions indicate that there was felt a need to send a strong signal that exploitation of poor populations as a means to an end, by research from which they would not benefit, was unacceptable. In this sense the Declaration endorsed ethical universalism.

Article 29 restates the use of placebo where 'no proven' intervention exists. Surprisingly, although the wording was virtually unchanged, this created far more protest in this revision. The implication being that placebos are not permitted where proven interventions are available. The placebo question was already an active debate prior to the fourth revision but had intensified, while at the same time the placebo question was still causing controversy in the international setting. This revision implies that in choosing a study design, developed-world standards of care should apply to any research conducted on human subjects, including those in developing countries. The wording of the fourth and fifth revisions reflect the position taken by Rothman and Michel and Freedman et al., known as 'active-control orthodoxy'. The opposing view, as expressed by Levine and by Temple and Ellenberg is referred to as 'placebo orthodoxy', insisting that placebo controls are more scientifically efficient and are justifiable where the risk of harm is low. This viewpoint argues that where no standards of care exist, as for instance in developing countries, then placebo-controlled trials are appropriate. The utilitarian argument held that the disadvantage to a few (such as denial of potentially beneficial interventions) was justifiable for the advantage of many future patients. These arguments are intimately tied to the concept of distributive justice, the equitable distribution of the burdens of research. As with much of the Declaration, there is room for interpretation of words. 'Best current' has been variously held to refer to either global or local contexts.

Article 30 introduced another new concept, that after the conclusion of the study patients 'should be assured of access to the best proven' intervention arising from the study, a justice issue. Arguments over this have dealt with whether subjects derive benefit from the trial and are no worse off at the end than the status quo prior to the trial, or of not participating, versus the harm of being denied access to that which they have contributed to. There are also operational issues that are unclear.

==== Aftermath ====
Given the lack of consensus on many issues prior to the fifth revision it is no surprise that the debates continued unabated. The debate over these and related issues also revealed differences in perspectives between developed and developing countries. Zion and colleagues (Zion 2000) have attempted to frame the debate more carefully, exploring the broader social and ethical issues and the lived realities of potential subjects' lives as well as acknowledging the limitations of absolute universality in a diverse world, particularly those framed in a context that might be considered elitist and structured by gender and geographic identity. As Macklin points out, both sides may be right, since justice "is not an unambiguous concept".

=== Clarifications of Articles 29, 30 (2002–2004) ===
Eventually Notes of Clarification (footnotes) to articles 29 and 30 were added in 2002 and 2004 respectively, predominantly under pressure from the US (CMAJ 2003, Blackmer 2005). The 2002 clarification to Article 29 was in response to many concerns about WMA's apparent position on placebos. As WMA states in the note, there appeared to be 'diverse interpretations and possibly confusion'. It then outlined circumstances in which a placebo might be 'ethically acceptable', namely 'compelling... methodological reasons', or 'minor conditions' where the 'risk of serious or irreversible harm' was considered low. Effectively this shifted the WMA position to what has been considered a 'middle ground'. Given the previous lack of consensus, this merely shifted the ground of debate, which now extended to the use of the 'or' connector. For this reason the footnote indicates that the wording must be interpreted in the light of all the other principles of the Declaration.

Article 30 was debated further at the 2003 meeting, with another proposed clarification but did not result in any convergence of thought, and so decisions were postponed for another year, but again a commitment was made to protecting the vulnerable. A new working group examined article 30, and recommended not amending it in January 2004. Later that year the American Medical Association proposed a further note of clarification that was incorporated. In this clarification the issue of post trial care now became something to consider, not an absolute assurance.

Despite these changes, as Macklin predicted, consensus was no closer and the Declaration was considered by some to be out of touch with contemporary thinking, and even the question of the future of the Declaration became a matter for conjecture.

Considerable deliberation has taken place regarding the most effective approach to address the concerns related to paragraph 30. Two distinct working groups have explored this matter and put forth various suggestions, which encompass potential revisions to the paragraph, the inclusion of a preamble, and the introduction of a clarifying note (similar to what was incorporated into paragraph 29). At a gathering of the WMA Council in France in May 2004, the American Medical Association presented the subsequent clarifying statement:

The WMA reaffirms its stance that it is imperative, within the study planning phase, to identify provisions for post-trial access by research participants to prophylactic, diagnostic, and therapeutic procedures deemed beneficial in the study or to access to other appropriate healthcare. The specifics of post-trial access arrangements or alternative care should be outlined in the study protocol, enabling the ethical review committee to evaluate these provisions during its assessment.

=== Sixth revision (2008) ===
The sixth revision cycle commenced in May 2007. This consisted of a call for submissions, completed in August 2007. The terms of reference included only a limited revision compared to 2000. In November 2007 a draft revision was issued for consultation until February 2008, and led to a workshop in Helsinki in March. Those comments were then incorporated into a second draft in May. Further workshops were held in Cairo and São Paulo and the comments collated in August 2008. A final text was then developed by the Working Group for consideration by the Ethics Committee and finally the General Assembly, which approved it on October 18. Public debate was relatively slight compared to previous cycles, and in general supportive. Input was received from a wide number of sources, some of which have been published, such as Feminist Approaches to Bioethics. Others include CIOMS and the US Government.

=== Seventh revision (2013) ===
The seventh revision of Helsinki (2013) was reflective of the controversy regarding the standard of care that arose from the vertical transmission trials. The revised declaration of 2013 also highlights the need to disseminate research results, including negative and inconclusive studies and also includes a requirement for treatment and compensation for injuries related to research. In addition, the updated version is felt to be more relevant to limited resource settings—specifically addressing the need to ensure access to an intervention if it is proven effective.

=== Eighth revision (2024) ===
The eighth revision of Helsinki (2024) newly highlights the roles of global inequities in medical research and includes a new statement that scientific integrity "is essential in the conduct of medical research involving human participants. Involved individuals, teams, and organizations must never engage in research misconduct".

== Future ==
The controversies and national divisions over the text have continued. The US FDA rejected the 2000 and subsequent revisions, only recognizing the third (1989) revision, and in 2006 announced it would eliminate all reference to the Declaration. After consultation, which included expressions of concern, a final rule was issued on April 28, 2008, replacing the Declaration of Helsinki with Good Clinical Practice effective October 2008. This has raised a number of concerns regarding the apparent weakening of protections for research subjects outside the United States. The NIH training in human subject research participant protection no longer refers to the Declaration of Helsinki. The European Union similarly only cites the 1996 version in the EU Clinical Trials Directive published in 2001. The European Commission, however, does refer to the 2000 revision.

While the Declaration has been a central document guiding research practice, its future has been called into question. Challenges include the apparent conflict between guides, such as the CIOMS and Nuffield Council documents. Another is whether it should concentrate on basic principles as opposed to being more prescriptive, and hence controversial. It has continually grown and faced more frequent revisions. The recent controversies undermine the authority of the document, as does the apparent desertion by major bodies, and any rewording must embrace deeply and widely held values, since continual shifts in the text do not imply authority. The actual claim to authority, particularly on a global level, by the insertion of the word "international" in article 10 has been challenged.

Carlson raises the question as to whether the document's utility should be more formally evaluated, rather than just relying on tradition.

=== The Declaration's long-standing pre-eminence ===
There appears to be a noticeable trend toward more frequent changes in the Declaration of Helsinki (DoH). However, it's important to note that only two of the revisions, in 1975 and 2000, introduced significant alterations. This means that there was an 11-year gap between comprehensive revisions (from 1964 to 1975) and a 25-year gap (from 1975 to 2000), respectively. Consequently, the DoH, essentially in its 1975 version, had a quarter-century to establish itself within the medical research community, and this has significantly contributed to its current status.

== World Medical Association (WMA) ==
One potential explanation is that it derives its legitimacy from being an official declaration of the World Medical Association (WMA). This organization represents the largest global assembly of physicians, and consequently, it could be argued that the WMA is a credible and authoritative entity for issuing statements on behalf of the medical profession as a whole.

However, a historical observation appears to challenge the notion that this explains the Declaration of Helsinki's authority. It can be argued that the Declaration was most widely accepted as an authoritative document during the period from the late 1970s (after the 1975 amendment had been widely promulgated) to the mid-to-late 1990s when increasing demands for changes to the Declaration began to emerge. Notably, this period was marked by significant internal unrest within the WMA. In the 1980s, a group of countries, known as the 'Toronto Group,' which included the UK, withdrew from the WMA due to persistent objections related to the South African Medical Association's failure to denounce apartheid. Historical events eventually led to the reconciliation of this division, and all the countries that had previously withdrawn had rejoined the WMA by 1995.

== Timeline (WMA meetings) ==
- 1964: Original version. 18th Meeting, Helsinki
- 1975: First revision. 29th Meeting, Tokyo
- 1983: Second revision. 35th Meeting, Venice
- 1989: Third revision. 41st Meeting, Hong Kong
- 1996: Fourth revision. 48th Meeting, Somerset West (South Africa)
- 2000: Fifth revision. 52nd Meeting, Edinburgh
- 2002: First clarification, Washington
- 2004: Second clarification, Tokyo
- 2008: Sixth revision, 59th Meeting, Seoul
- 2013: Seventh revision, 64th Meeting, Fortaleza
- 2024: Eighth revision, 75th Meeting, Helsinki

== Other notable developments ==
- 2014: This was the 50th anniversary of declaration. To mark this special occasion, the WMA published "The World Medical Association Declaration of Helsinki: 1964-2014 50 Years of Evolution of Medical Research Ethics.".
- 2016: The Declaration of Taipei on Ethical Considerations regarding Health Databases and Biobanks finally complemented the Declaration of Helsinki.

== See also ==
- Informed consent
- Medical ethics
- Clinical trial
- Human experimentation in the United States
- Clinical Research

== Training ==
- U.S. National Institutes of Health (NIH) - Protecting Human Subject Research Participants

== Bibliography ==
=== Articles ===
==== 1990-1999 ====
- Studdert DM, Brennan TA (November 1998). "Clinical trials in developing countries: scientific and ethical issues". The Medical Journal of Australia. 169 (10): 545–8. doi:10.5694/j.1326-5377.1998.tb123406.x. PMID 9861913. S2CID 33885748.
- McNeill PM (November 1998). "Should research ethics change at the border?". The Medical Journal of Australia. 169 (10): 509–10. doi:10.5694/j.1326-5377.1998.tb123394.x. PMID 9861904. S2CID 36042251.
- Lurie P, Wolfe SM (July 1999). "Proposed revisions to the Declaration of Helsinki. Paving the way for globalization in research". The Western Journal of Medicine. 171 (1): 6. PMC 1305720. PMID 10483334.

==== 2000-2008 ====
Prior to fifth revision

- Rothman, KJ (2000). "Declaration of Helsinki should be strengthened". BMJ (Clinical Research Ed.). 321 (7258): 442–5. doi:10.1136/bmj.321.7258.442. PMC 1127802. PMID 10938059.

Following fifth revision

- Vastag B. Helsinki Discord? A Controversial Declaration. JAMA 2000 Dec 20 284:2983-2985 (password required)
- (References)
- Singer P, Benatar S. Beyond Helsinki: a vision for global health ethics. BMJ 2001 March 31 322:747-748
- Lilford RJ, Djulbegovic B (February 2001). "Declaration of Helsinki should be strengthened: Equipoise is essential principle of human experimentation". BMJ. 322 (7281): 299–300. doi:10.1136/bmj.322.7281.299/a. PMC 1119536. PMID 11157551.
- Lewis, JA; Jonsson, B; Kreutz, G; Sampaio, C; Van Zwieten-Boot, B (2002). "Placebo-controlled trials and the Declaration of Helsinki". Lancet. 359 (9314): 1337–40. doi:10.1016/S0140-6736(02)08277-6. PMID 11965296. S2CID 8221201.
- Frankish, H (2003). "WMA postpones decision to amend Declaration of Helsinki. Working group will consider controversy over sponsors' duties to provide treatment at study end". Lancet. 362 (9388): 963. doi:10.1016/S0140-6736(03)14398-X. PMID 14513842. S2CID 39256431.
- MacKlin, Ruth (2003). "Bioethics, Vulnerability, and Protection". Bioethics. 17 (5–6): 472–86. doi:10.1111/1467-8519.00362. PMID 14959716.
- Zion, D (2003). "Justice as equitable power relations: beyond the "standard of care" debate and the Declaration of Helsinki". The American Journal of Bioethics. 3 (2): 34–35. doi:10.1162/152651603322874906. PMID 14635633. S2CID 46569918.
- Schuklenk, U (2004). "The standard of care debate: against the myth of an "international consensus opinion"". Journal of Medical Ethics. 30 (2): 194–7. doi:10.1136/jme.2003.006981. PMC 1733846. PMID 15082817.
- Williams JR (2006). "The Physician's Role in the Protection of Human Research Subjects". Science and Engineering Ethics. 12 (1): 5–12. doi:10.1007/pl00022264. PMID 16501643. S2CID 34926262.
- Carlson RV, van Ginneken NH, Pettigrew LM, Davies A, Boyd KM, Webb DJ (2007). "The three official language versions of the Declaration of Helsinki: what's lost in translation?". J Med Ethics. 33 (9): 545–548. doi:10.1136/jme.2006.018168. PMC 2598189. PMID 17761826.
- S Frewer A, Schmidt U, eds. History and theory of human experimentation: the Declaration of Helsinki and modern medical ethics. Stuttgart: Franz Steiner Verlag, 2007.
- Goodyear, M. D E; Krleza-Jeric, K.; Lemmens, T. (2007). "The Declaration of Helsinki". BMJ. 335 (7621): 624–5. doi:10.1136/bmj.39339.610000.BE. PMC 1995496. PMID 17901471.

Following sixth revision

- WMA News: Revising the Declaration of Helsinki. World Medical Journal 2008; 54(4): 120-25
- Normile, D. (2008). "ETHICS: Clinical Trials Guidelines at Odds With U.S. Policy". Science. 322 (5901): 516. doi:10.1126/science.322.5901.516. PMID 18948510. S2CID 206582738.

=== WMA ===
- International response to Helsinki VI (2000). WMA 2001

== Other codes and regulations ==
- Nuremberg Code
- Declaration of Helsinki
- Belmont Report
- CIOMS
- Good clinical practice (GCP)
- International Conference on Harmonisation of Technical Requirements for Registration of Pharmaceuticals for Human Use
- Code of Federal Regulations
