= Justice (research) =

In research ethics, justice regards fairness in the distribution of burdens and benefits of research. For example, justice is a consideration in recruiting volunteer research participants, in considering any existing burdens the groups from which they are recruited face (such as historic marginalisation) and the risks of the research, alongside the potential benefits of the research.

== Defining research justice ==
The most commonly recognized source for drawing attention to the importance of justice is the Belmont Report, which used the term "justice" to describe a set of guidelines for the selection of research subjects. This is a critical safeguard to making clinical research ethical.
