= Beneficence (ethics) =

Concept in ethics

Beneficence in general means "active well-doing". Duties of beneficence form a part of various religious and secular ethical theories. As an applied ethical concept relating to research, beneficence means that researchers should have the welfare of the research participant as a goal of any clinical trial or other research study. The antonym of this term, maleficence, describes a practice that opposes the welfare of any research participant. According to the Belmont Report, researchers are required to follow two moral requirements in line with the principle of beneficence: do not harm, and maximize possible benefits for research while minimizing any potential harm on others.

The idea that medical professionals and researchers would always practice beneficence seems natural to most patients and research participants, but in fact, every health intervention or research intervention has potential to harm the recipient. There are many different precedents in medicine and research for conducting a cost–benefit analysis and judging whether a certain action would be a sufficient practice of beneficence, and the extent to which treatments are acceptable or unacceptable is under debate.

Despite differences in opinion, there are many concepts on which there is wide agreement. One is that there should be community consensus when determining best practices for dealing with ethical problems.

== Elements ==
These four concepts often arise in discussions about beneficence:

1. one should not practice evil or do harm, often stated in Latin as Primum non nocere
2. one should prevent evil or harm
3. one should remove evil or harm
4. one should practice good

Ordinary moral discourse and most philosophical systems state that a prohibition on doing harm to others as in #1 is more compelling than any duty to benefit others as in #2–4. This makes the concept of "first do no harm" different from the other aspects of beneficence. One example illustrating this concept is the trolley problem.

Morality and ethical theory allows for judging relative costs, so in the case when a harm to be inflicted in violating #1 is negligible and the harm prevented or benefit gained in #2–4 is substantial, then it may be acceptable to cause one harm to gain another benefit. Academic literature discusses different variations of such scenarios. There is no objective evidence which dictates the best course of action when health professionals and researchers disagree about the best course of action for participants except that most people agree that the discussions about ethics should happen.

== Problem ==
Some outstanding problems in discussing beneficence occur repeatedly. Researchers often describe these problems in the following categories:

=== To what extent should the benefactor suffer harm for the beneficiary? ===
Many people share the view that when it is trivial to do so, people should help each other. The situation becomes more complicated when one person can help another by making various degrees of personal sacrifice. Young and Wagner provided a formula to guide decision-making for this situation. They also argued that, for healthcare professionals and other types of professionals subject to moral codes, in general beneficence takes priority over non-maleficence (“first, do good,” not “first, do no harm”) both historically and philosophically.

=== To whom are duties of beneficence owed? ===
Researchers should apply the concept of beneficence to individuals within the patient/physician relationship or the research-participant/researcher relationship. However, there is debate about the extent to which the interests of other parties, such as future patients and endangered persons, ought to be considered. When a researcher risks harm to a willing volunteer to do research with the intent to develop knowledge which will better humanity, this may be a practice of beneficence.

== See also ==
- Values in medical ethics
- Leaving the world a better place
- Primum non nocere
