= Common Rule =

Rule of ethics for human subjects research

The Common Rule is a 1991 rule of ethics in the United States regarding biomedical and behavioral research involving human subjects. A significant revision became effective July 2018. It governed Institutional Review Boards for oversight of human research and followed the 1975 revision of the Declaration of Helsinki; it is encapsulated in the 1991 revision to the U.S. Department of Health and Human Services Title 45 CFR 46 (Public Welfare) Subparts A, B, C and D. Subpart A. The Common Rule is the baseline standard of ethics by which any government-funded research in the US is held; nearly all U.S. academic institutions hold their researchers to these statements of rights regardless of funding.

== Background ==
The Common Rule is a 1991 rule of ethics (revised in 2018) regarding biomedical and behavioral research involving human subjects in the United States. The regulations governing Institutional Review Boards for oversight of human research followed the 1975 revision of the Declaration of Helsinki, and are encapsulated in the 1991 revision to the U.S. Department of Health and Human Services Title 45 CFR 46 (Public Welfare) Subparts A, B, C and D. Subpart A. The Common Rule is the baseline standard of ethics by which any government-funded research in the US is held; nearly all academic institutions hold their researchers to these statements of rights regardless of funding.

== Main elements ==
The main elements of the Common Rule include:

- Requirements for assuring compliance by research institutions
- Requirements for researchers' obtaining, waiving, and documenting informed consent
- Requirements for Institutional Review Board (IRB) membership, function, operations, review of research, and record keeping.

The Common Rule includes additional protections for certain vulnerable research subjects:

- Subpart B provides additional protections for pregnant women, in vitro fertilization, and fetuses
- Subpart C contains additional protections for prisoners
- Subpart D does the same for children.

== Signatories ==
The list below displays the 20 agencies and departments that have signed onto the Common Rule and their CFR numbers for those with published statutes.

1. Department of Agriculture (7 CFR Part 1c)
2. Department of Commerce, National Institute of Standards and Technology (15 CFR Part 27)
3. Department of Energy (10 CFR Part 745)
4. Department of Education (34 CFR Part 97)
5. Department of Defense (32 CFR Part 219)
6. Department of Health and Human Services (45 CFR Part 46)
7. Department of Homeland Security (6 CFR Part 46)
8. Department of Housing and Urban Development (24 CFR Part 60)
9. Department of Justice, National Institute of Justice (28 CFR Part 46)
10. Department of Labor (29 CFR Part 21)
11. Department of Transportation (49 CFR Part 11)
12. Department of Veterans Affairs, Office of Research Oversight, Office of Research and Development (38 CFR Part 16)
13. Agency for International Development (USAID) (22 CFR Part 225)
14. Central Intelligence Agency
15. Consumer Product Safety Commission (16 CFR Part 1028)
16. Environmental Protection Agency, Research and Development (40 CFR Part 26)
17. National Aeronautics and Space Administration (14 CFR Part 1230)
18. National Science Foundation (45 CFR Part 690)
19. Office of the Director of National Intelligence
20. Social Security Administration (20 CFR 431)
