= National Commission for the Protection of Human Subjects of Biomedical and Behavioral Research =

U.S. bioethics commission

National Commission for the Protection of Human Subjects of Biomedical and Behavioral Research was the first public national body to shape bioethics policy in the United States.

Formed in the aftermath of the Tuskegee Experiment scandal, the commission was created in 1974 as Title II of the National Research Act. It was part of the United States Department of Health, Education, and Welfare (DHEW) until 1978.

== Goals ==
The commission had four goals that it needed to analyze:

1) the boundaries between biomedical and behavioral research and what the accepted and routine practices of medicine were

2) assessing the risks and benefits of the appropriateness of research involving human subjects

3) determining appropriate guidelines for how human subjects can be chosen for the participation in such research

4) defining what informed consent is in each research setting.

== Work ==
The commission also had the task of making recommendations to the Secretary of Health, Education, and Welfare and Congress for the protection of Human subjects. The commission produced their Reports and Recommendations on the following areas of research:

- Research on the Fetus (1975)
- Research Involving Prisoners (1976)
- Research Involving Children (1977)
- Psychosurgery Report and Recommendations (March 1977)
- Disclosure of Research Information Under the Freedom of Information Act (April 1977)
- Research Involving Those Institutionalized as Mentally Infirm (1978)
- Ethical Guidelines for the Delivery of Health Services by DHEW (1978)
- Appendix to Ethical Guidelines for the Delivery of Health Services by DHEW (1978)
- Institutional Review Boards (1978)
- Special Study Implications of Advances in Biomedical and Behavioral Research (1978)
- The Belmont Report: Ethical Principles and Guidelines for Protection of Human Subjects of Biomedical and Behavioral Research (1979)

These reports contained their recommendations, the underlying deliberations and conclusions, a dissenting statement and additional statement by commission members and summaries of materials presented to the commission. An appendix was also included which contained complete text reports and papers prepared for the commission on the ethical, legal and medical aspects of the different research areas examined and other material reviewed by the commission in its deliberations.

The commission established limits on Biomedical research such that pregnant women and their fetuses were not harmed by researchers or exposed to any form of risk. The commission further established that the health of a pregnant woman or her fetus could not be compromised under any circumstance for the purposes of research no matter how minute the perceived risk may be. Furthermore, the commission suggested lifting the moratorium imposed on abortion research at that time under the condition that no inducements were offered to subjects to undergo an abortion for the purpose of research. However research on a dead fetus or dead fetal tissue was approved. Lastly, non-therapeutic research upon a pregnant woman or fetus was approved only under the extenuating circumstance that important biomedical knowledge could not be obtained through any other means and that permission was granted to researchers by the subject.

The commission was succeeded by the President's Commission for the Study of Ethical Problems in Medicine and Biomedical and Behavioral Research.

== See also ==
- Human experimentation in the United States
- Advisory Committee on Human Radiation Experiments
- National Bioethics Advisory Commission
- President's Council on Bioethics
