= Human subject research =

Systematic, scientific investigation that involves human beings as research subjects

1946 military human subjects research on the effects of wind on humans

Human subjects research is systematic, scientific investigation that can be either interventional (a "trial") or observational (no "test article") and involves human beings as research subjects, commonly known as test subjects. Human subjects research can be either medical (clinical) research or non-medical (e.g., social science) research. Systematic investigation incorporates both the collection and analysis of data in order to answer a specific question. Medical human subjects research often involves analysis of biological specimens, epidemiological and behavioral studies and medical chart review studies. (A specific, and especially heavily regulated, type of medical human subjects research is the "clinical trial", in which drugs, vaccines and medical devices are evaluated.) On the other hand, human subjects research in the social sciences often involves surveys which consist of questions to a particular group of people. Survey methodology includes questionnaires, interviews, and focus groups.

Human subjects research is used in numerous fields, including research into advanced biology, clinical medicine, nursing, psychology, sociology, political science, and anthropology. As research has become formalized, the academic community has developed formal definitions of "human subjects research", largely in response to abuses of human subjects.

== Human subjects ==
The United States Department of Health and Human Services (HHS) defines a human research subject as a living individual about whom a research investigator (whether a professional or a student) obtains data through 1) intervention or interaction with the individual, or 2) identifiable private information (32 CFR 219.102). (Lim, 1990)

As defined by HHS regulations (45 CFR 46.102):

- Intervention – physical procedures by which data is gathered and the manipulation of the subject or their environment for research purposes.
- Interaction – communication or interpersonal contact between investigator and subject.
- Private Information – information about behavior that occurs in a context in which an individual can reasonably expect that no observation or recording is taking place, and information which has been provided for specific purposes by an individual and which the individual can reasonably expect will not be made public.
- Identifiable information – specific information that can be used to identify an individual.

=== Human subject rights ===
In 2010, the National Institute of Justice in the United States published recommended rights of human subjects:

- Voluntary, informed consent
- Respect for persons: treated as autonomous agents
- The right to end participation in research at any time
- Right to safeguard integrity
- Protection from physical, mental and emotional harm
- Access to information regarding research
- Protection of privacy and well-being

=== From Subject to Participant ===
The term research subject has traditionally been the preferred term in professional guidelines and academic literature to describe a patient or an individual taking part in biomedical research. In recent years, however, there has been a steady shift away from the use of the term 'research subject' in favour of 'research participant' when referring to individuals who take part by providing data to various kinds of biomedical and epidemiological research.

== Ethical guidelines ==
In general, it can be said that experimental infections in humans are tightly linked to a history of scandals in medical research, with scandals being followed by stricter regulatory rules. Ethical guidelines that govern the use of human subjects in research are a fairly new construct. In 1906 some regulations were put in place in the United States to protect subjects from abuses. After the passage of the Pure Food and Drug Act in 1906, regulatory bodies such as the Food and Drug Administration (FDA) and institutional review boards (IRBs) were gradually introduced. The policies that these institutions implemented served to minimize harm to the participant's mental or physical well-being.

=== The Common Rule ===
The Common Rule, first published in 1991, also known as the Federal Policy for the Protection of Human Subjects, is dictated by the Office of Human Research Protections under the United States Department of Health and Human Services and serves as a set of guidelines for institutional review boards (IRBs), obtaining informed consent, and Assurances of Compliance for human subject participants in research studies. On January 19, 2017, a 'Revised Common Rule' was published in the Federal Register with an official effective date of July 19, 2018.

=== Nuremberg Code ===
In 1947, German physicians who conducted deadly or debilitating experiments on concentration camp prisoners were prosecuted as war criminals in the Nuremberg Trials. A portion of the verdict handed down in the doctors' trial became commonly known as the Nuremberg Code, the first international document to clearly articulate the concept that "the voluntary consent of the human subject is absolutely essential". Individual consent was emphasized in the Nuremberg Code in order to prevent prisoners of war, patients, prisoners, and soldiers from being coerced into becoming human subjects. In addition, it was emphasized in order to inform participants of the risk-benefit outcomes of experiments.

=== Declaration of Helsinki ===
The Declaration of Helsinki was established in 1964 to regulate international research involving human subjects. Established by the World Medical Association, the declaration recommended guidelines for medical doctors conducting biomedical research that involves human subjects. Some of these guidelines included the principles that "research protocols should be reviewed by an independent committee prior to initiation" and that "research with humans should be based on results from laboratory animals and experimentation".

The Declaration of Helsinki is widely regarded as the cornerstone document on human research ethics.

=== The Belmont Report ===
The Belmont Report was created in 1978 by the National Commission for the Protection of Human Subjects of Biomedical and Behavioral Research to describe the ethical behaviors that involve researching human subjects. It is most heavily used by the current United States system for protecting human subjects in research trials. By looking primarily at biomedical and behavioral research that involve human subjects, the report was generated to promise that ethical standards are followed during research of human subjects. There are three standards that serve as the baseline for the report and how human subjects are to be researched. The three guidelines are beneficence, justice and respect for persons. Beneficence is described as protecting the well-being of the persons and respecting their decisions by being ethical and protecting the subjects from harm. The two rules of beneficence are maximizing the benefits of research and minimizing any possible risks. It is the job of the researcher to inform the persons of the benefits as well as the risks of human subjects research. Justice is important because it causes the researchers to be fair in their research findings and share what they have found, whether the information is good or bad. The selection process of the subject is supposed to be fair and not separate due to race, sexual orientation or ethnic group. Lastly, respect for persons explains that at any point a person who is involved in a study can decide whether they want to participate, not to participate or withdraw themselves from the study altogether. Two rules of respect for persons involve the person being autonomous and persons with diminished autonomy and entitled to protection. The sole purpose of these guidelines is to ensure autonomy and to protect against those with a lesser chance to remain autonomous because of something out of their control.

== Ethical concerns ==
As science and medicine evolve, the field of bioethics struggles to keep up with updating guidelines and rules to follow. There has been an interest in revisiting the ethics behind human subject trials. Members of the health field have commented that it may be useful to have ethics classes available to students studying to be health care professionals as well as have more discussions surrounding the issues and importance of informed consent. There have also been a bigger push to protect participants in clinical trials. Rules and regulations of clinical trials can vary by country. Suggestions to remedy this include installing a committee to keep better track of this information and ensure that everything is properly documented. Research coordinators and physicians involved in clinical studies have their own concerns, particularly that an implementation of ethics rules could potentially disrupt the logistics of preparing a research study, specifically when it comes to enrolling patients. Another concern that research teams may have is that even if the rules are ethically sound, they may not be logical or helpful for conducting their studies.

Of note currently in the research field is the manner in which researchers direct their conversations with potential human subjects for a research study.

=== Research in rural communities ===
Recently there has been a shift from conducting research studies at research institution facilities or academic centers to rural communities. There is concern surrounding the topics addressed during the discussions with this specific demographic of participants, particularly having to do with funding, overall efficacy of the treatment being studied, and if conducting such studies is done to the highest ethical standard.

Ann Cook and Freeman Hoas from the University of Montana's Department of Psychology conducted a study to gain more understanding about what influences potential candidates to consent to participation in any given clinical trial. They published their findings in February 2015. Cook and Hoas asked for the perspectives of the researchers and whether they would consent to being a subject in a clinical trial. To assess the shift to rural communities, they surveyed 34 physicians or researchers and 46 research coordinators from states that have "large rural populations and have historically demonstrated limited participation in clinical research." Proper consent forms were provided and signed at the start of the study. Of the physicians and research coordinators that participated in this study, 90% were from hospital centers or worked in a hospital-clinic setting. Of all the participants, only 66% of research coordinators and 53% of physicians received training in research methods, while 59% of the coordinators received any ethics training. Only 17% of the physicians had ethics research training prior to this study.

==== The role of funding ====
Cook and Hoas found that funding played a significant role in participant selection. One of Hoas's and Cook's participants commented that "in his practice, the income from conducting pharmaceutical trials sometimes [is] used to offset the losses of conducting scientifically interesting but poorly funded federal studies," and most other participants administered trials because "reimbursements generated from such trials made it possible to maintain a financially viable, as well as profitable, practice." Cook and Hoas found that most of the physicians and coordinators could not explain directly if they actually told their patients or subjects about any financial compensation they received. Respondents worry that discussing funding or compensation would affect enrollment, effectively swaying participants from joining a research study. In most respondents' experience, most patients do not even ask for that information, so they assume that they do not have to discuss it with them and not jeopardize enrollment. When asked if information about funding or compensation would be important to provide to patients, one physician replied "...certainly it may influence or bring up in their mind questions whether or not, you know, we want them to participate because we're gonna get paid for this, you know, budget dollar amount. But, you know, when you talk about full disclosure, is that something that we should be doing? That's an interesting question."

==== Morally nagging or challenging issues ====
The 2015 survey of doctors conducting medical research found respondents more often pointed out practical or logistical issues with the overall process rather than ethical issues. There was a general consensus that the whole practice of conducting research studies was more focused on the business aspects like funding and enrolling participants in the study in time. A physician commented that "[industry] relationships are very important because of cash flow."

Typical ethical issues that arise in this type of research trials include participant enrollment, the question of coercion if a physician refers their own patients, and any misunderstandings regarding treatment benefits. Patients are more likely to enroll in a trial if their primary care physician or a provider that they trust recommends the study. Most respondents to the survey agreed that patients consent to participate because they believe that through this study, they would be receiving "more attention than my regular patients" and that "there are an awful lot of additional opportunities for interaction." One respondent commented "...the way that we're required to actually recruit patients, which is to have their providers be the point of contact, some ways is--I mean, I don't want to use the word 'coercion', but it's kind of leaning in that direction because basically here's this person that they entrust themselves to, who they're very dependent on for, you know, getting their healthcare."

There was a large amount of respondents who thought that research participants did not read or understand the documents provided for informed consent. However, those respondents did not believe that was an ethical or moral concern.

==== Willingness to join a research study ====
Most of the coordinators and researchers showed some hesitation when they were asked if they would enroll as a subject in a clinical trial, not necessarily their own, but any study. When asked to elaborate on their hesitation, many said that they would be "concerned about the motivations behind the study, its purpose, its funding, as well as expectations of what participation might entail." Ultimately, only 24% of the respondents said they would be willing to participate with a majority of them stating they would need full transparency and an indication that there would be some personal benefit in order for them to even consider participating. Some had a list of criteria that had to be met. Eleven percent indicated that they would not at all be willing to enroll in a research study. One respondent commented "If it involved taking a medication, no. Never. I would be in a clinical trial if there was something, like...track [your] mammogram…[something] I am already subjecting myself to." Cook and Hoas stated that these answers were "particularly puzzling" because "these respondents still reported that their patient/participants received 'optimal care'" from clinical trials.

== Clinical trials ==
Clinical trials are experiments done in clinical research. Such prospective biomedical or behavioral research studies on human participants are designed to answer specific questions about biomedical or behavioral interventions, including new treatments (such as novel vaccines, drugs, dietary choices, dietary supplements, and medical devices) and known interventions that warrant further study and comparison. Clinical trials generate data on safety and efficacy. They are conducted only after they have received health authority/ethics committee approval in the country where approval of the therapy is sought. These authorities are responsible for vetting the risk/benefit ratio of the trial - their approval does not mean that the therapy is 'safe' or effective, only that the trial may be conducted.

Depending on product type and development stage, investigators initially enroll volunteers or patients into small pilot studies, and subsequently conduct progressively larger scale comparative studies. Clinical trials can vary in size and cost, and they can involve a single research center or multiple centers, in one country or in multiple countries. Clinical study design aims to ensure the scientific validity and reproducibility of the results.

Trials can be quite costly, depending on a number of factors. The sponsor may be a governmental organization or a pharmaceutical, biotechnology or medical device company. Certain functions necessary to the trial, such as monitoring and lab work, may be managed by an outsourced partner, such as a contract research organization or a central laboratory. For example, a clinical drug trial case at the University of Minnesota that was under investigation in 2015 for the Death of Dan Markingson was funded by AstraZeneca, a pharmaceutical company headquartered in the United Kingdom.

== Human subjects in psychology and sociology ==
=== Stanford prison experiment ===
A study conducted by Philip Zimbardo in 1971 examined the effect of social roles on college students at Stanford University. Twenty-four male students were assigned to a random role of a prisoner or guard to simulate a mock prison in one of Stanford's basements. After only six days, the abusive behavior of the guards and the psychological suffering of prisoners proved significant enough to halt the two-week-long experiment. The goal of the experiment was to determine whether dispositional factors (the behavior of guards and prisoners) or positional factors (the social environment of prisons) are the major cause of conflict within such facilities. The results of this experiment showed that people will readily conform to the specific social roles they are supposed to play. The prison environment played a part in making the guards behavior more brutal, due to the fact that none of the participants showed this type of behavior beforehand. Most of the guards had a hard time believing they had been acting in such a way. The evidence concludes this to be positional behavior, meaning the behavior was due to the hostile environment of the prison.

=== Milgram experiment ===
In 1961, Yale University psychologist Stanley Milgram led a series of experiments to determine to what extent an individual would obey instructions given by an experimenter. Placed in a room with the experimenter, subjects played the role of a "teacher" to a "learner" situated in a separate room. The subjects were instructed to administer an electric shock to the learner when the learner answered incorrectly to a set of questions. The intensity of this electric shock was to be increased for every incorrect answer. The learner was a confederate (i.e. actor), and the shocks were faked, but the subjects were led to believe otherwise. Both prerecorded sounds of electric shocks and the confederate's pleas for the punishment to stop were audible to the "teacher" throughout the experiment. When the subject raised questions or paused, the experimenter insisted that the experiment should continue. Despite widespread speculation that most participants would not continue to "shock" the learner, 65 percent of participants in Milgram's initial trial complied until the end of the experiment, continuing to administer shocks to the confederate with purported intensities of up to "450 volts". Although many participants questioned the experimenter and displayed various signs of discomfort, when the experiment was repeated, 65 percent of subjects were willing to obey instructions to administer the shocks through the final one.

=== Asch conformity experiments ===
Psychologist Solomon Asch's classic conformity experiment in 1951 involved one subject participant and multiple confederates; they were asked to provide answers to a variety of different low-difficulty questions. In every scenario, the multiple confederates gave their answers in turn, and the participant subject was allowed to answer last. In a control group of participants, the percentage of error was less than one percent. However, when the confederates unanimously chose an incorrect answer, 75 percent of the subject participants agreed with the majority at least once. The study has been regarded as significant evidence for the power of social influence and conformity.

=== Robber's Cave study ===
A classic advocate of realistic conflict theory, Muzafer Sherif's Robber's Cave experiment shed light on how group competition can foster hostility and prejudice. In the 1961 study, two groups of ten boys each who were not "naturally" hostile were grouped together without knowledge of one another in Robber's Cave State Park, Oklahoma. The twelve-year-old boys bonded with their own groups for a week before the groups were set in competition with each other in games such as tug-of-war and football. When competing, the groups resorted to name-calling and other displays of resentment, such as burning the other group's team flag. The hostility continued and worsened until the end of the three-week study, when the groups were forced to work together to solve problems.

=== Bystander effect ===
The bystander effect is demonstrated in a series of famous experiments by Bibb Latane and John Darley. In each of these experiments, participants were confronted with a type of emergency, such as the witnessing of a seizure or smoke entering through air vents. A common phenomenon was observed that as the number of witnesses or "bystanders" increases, so does the time it takes for individuals to respond to the emergency. This effect has been shown to promote the diffusion of responsibility by concluding that, when surrounded by others, the individual expects someone else to take action.

=== Cognitive dissonance ===
Human subjects have been commonly used in experiments testing the theory of cognitive dissonance after the landmark study by Leon Festinger and Merrill Carlsmith. In 1959, Festinger and Carlsmith devised a situation in which participants would undergo excessively tedious and monotonous tasks. After the completion of these tasks, the subjects were instructed to help the experiment continue in exchange for a variable amount of money. All the subjects had to do was simply inform the next "student" waiting outside the testing area (who was secretly a confederate) that the tasks involved in the experiment were interesting and enjoyable. It was expected that the participants would not fully agree with the information they were imparting to the student, and after complying, half of the participants were awarded $1 (roughly the same as $11 now), and the others were awarded $20 (like $221 now). A subsequent survey showed that, by a large margin, those who received less money for essentially "lying" to the student came to believe that the tasks were far more enjoyable than their highly paid counterparts.

=== Vehicle safety ===
In the automotive industry, research has shown that civilian volunteers decided to participate in vehicle safety research to help automobile designers improve upon safety restraints for vehicles. This research allows designers to gather more data on the tolerance of the human body in the event of an automobile accident, in order to better improve safety features in automobiles. Some of the tests conducted ranged from sled runs evaluating head–neck injuries, airbag tests, and tests involving military vehicles and their restraint systems. From thousands of tests involving human subjects, results indicate no serious injuries were persistent. This is largely due to the preparation efforts of researchers to ensure all ethical guidelines are followed and to ensure the safety and well-being of their subjects. Although this research provides positive contributions, there are some drawbacks and resistance to human subjects research for crash testing due to the liability of injury and the lack of facilities that have appropriate machinery to perform such experiments. Research with live persons provides additional data which might be unobtainable when testing with cadavers or crash test dummies.

=== Social media ===
The increased use of social media as a data source for researchers has led to new uncertainties regarding the definition of human subjects research. Privacy, confidentiality, and informed consent are key concerns, yet it is unclear when social media users qualify as human subjects. Moreno et al. conclude that if access to the social media content is public, information is identifiable but not private, and information gathering requires no interaction with the person who posted it online, then the research is unlikely to qualify as human subjects research. Defining features of human subjects research, according to federal regulations, are that the researchers interact directly with the subject or obtain identifiable private information about the subject. Social media research may or may not meet this definition. A research institution's institutional review board (IRB) is often responsible for reviewing potential research on human subjects, but IRB protocols regarding social media research may be vague or outdated.

Concerns regarding privacy and informed consent have surfaced regarding multiple social media studies. A research project by Harvard sociologists, known as "Tastes, Ties, and Time", utilized data from Facebook profiles of students at an "anonymous, northeastern American university" that was quickly identified as Harvard, potentially placing the privacy of the human subjects at risk. The data set was removed from public access shortly after the issue was identified. The issue was complicated by the fact that the research project was partially funded by the National Science Foundation, which mandates the projects it funds to engage in data sharing.

A study by Facebook and researchers at Cornell University, published in the Proceedings of the National Academy of Sciences in 2014, collected data from hundreds of thousands of Facebook users after temporarily removing certain types of emotional content from their News Feed. Many considered this a violation of the requirement for informed consent in human subjects research. Because the data was collected by Facebook, a private company, in a manner that was consistent with its Data Use Policy and user terms and agreements, the Cornell IRB board determined that the study did not fall under its jurisdiction. It has been argued that this study broke the law nonetheless by violating state laws regarding informed consent. Others have noted that speaking out against these research methods may be counterproductive, as private companies will likely continue to experiment on users, but will be dis-incentivized from sharing their methods or findings with scientists or the public. In an "Editorial Expression of Concern" that was added to the online version of the research paper, PNAS states that while they "deemed it appropriate to publish the paper... It is nevertheless a matter of concern that the collection of the data by Facebook may have involved practices that were not fully consistent with the principles of obtaining informed consent and allowing participants to opt out."

Moreno et al.'s recommended considerations for social media research are: 1) determine if the study qualifies as human subjects research, 2) consider the risk level of the content, 3) present research and motives accurately when engaging on social media, 4) provide contact information throughout the consent process, 5) make sure data is not identifiable or searchable (avoid direct quotes that may be identifiable with an online search), 6) consider developing project privacy policies in advance, and 7) be aware that each state has its own laws regarding informed consent. Social media sites offer great potential as a data source by providing access to hard-to-reach research subjects and groups, capturing the natural, "real-world" responses of subjects, and providing affordable and efficient data collection methods.

== Unethical human experimentation ==
Unethical human experimentation violates the principles of medical ethics. It has been performed by countries including Nazi Germany, Imperial Japan, North Korea, the United States and the Soviet Union. Examples include Project MKUltra, Unit 731, Totskoye nuclear exercise, the experiments of Josef Mengele, and the human experimentation conducted by Chester M. Southam.

Nazi Germany performed human experimentation on large numbers of prisoners (including children), largely Jews from across Europe, but also Romani, Sinti, ethnic Poles, Soviet POWs and disabled Germans in its concentration camps mainly in the early 1940s, during World War II and the Holocaust. Prisoners were forced into participating; they did not willingly volunteer and no consent was given for the procedures. Typically, the experiments resulted in death, trauma, disfigurement or permanent disability, and as such are considered as examples of medical torture. After the war, these crimes were tried at what became known as the Doctors' Trial, and the abuses perpetrated led to the development of the Nuremberg Code. During the Nuremberg Trials, 23 Nazi doctors and scientists were prosecuted for the unethical treatment of concentration camp inmates, who were often used as research subjects with fatal consequences. Of those 23, 15 were convicted, seven of them were condemned to death by hanging, five were sentenced to life imprisonment, four were given prison sentences from 10 to 20 years, and seven were acquitted.

Unit 731, a department of the Imperial Japanese Army located near Harbin (then in the puppet state of Manchukuo, in northeast China), experimented on prisoners by conducting vivisections, dismemberments, and bacterial inoculations. It induced epidemics on a very large scale from 1932 onward through the Second Sino-Japanese War. It also conducted biological and chemical weapons tests on prisoners and captured POWs. With the expansion of the empire during World War II, similar units were set up in conquered cities such as Nanking (Unit 1644), Beijing (Unit 1855), Guangzhou (Unit 8604) and Singapore (Unit 9420). After the war, Supreme Commander of the Occupation Douglas MacArthur gave immunity in the name of the United States to Shirō Ishii and all members of the units in exchange for all of the results of their experiments.

During World War II, Fort Detrick in Maryland was the headquarters of US biological warfare experiments. Operation Whitecoat involved the injection of infectious agents into military forces to observe their effects in human subjects. Subsequent human experiments in the United States have also been characterized as unethical. They were often performed illegally, without the knowledge, consent, or informed consent of the test subjects. Public outcry over the discovery of government experiments on human subjects led to numerous congressional investigations and hearings, including the Church Committee, Rockefeller Commission, and Advisory Committee on Human Radiation Experiments, amongst others. The Tuskegee syphilis experiment, widely regarded as the "most infamous biomedical research study in U.S. history," was performed from 1932 to 1972 by the Tuskegee Institute contracted by the United States Public Health Service. The study followed more than 600 African-American men who were not told they had syphilis and were denied access to the known treatment of penicillin. This led to the 1974 National Research Act, to provide for protection of human subjects in experiments. The National Commission for the Protection of Human Subjects of Biomedical and Behavioral Research was established and was tasked with establishing the boundary between research and routine practice, the role of risk-benefit analysis, guidelines for participation, and the definition of informed consent. Its Belmont Report established three tenets of ethical research: respect for persons, beneficence, and justice.

From the 1950s to the 60s, Chester M. Southam, an important virologist and cancer researcher, injected HeLa cells into cancer patients, healthy individuals, and prison inmates from the Ohio Penitentiary. He wanted to observe if cancer could be transmitted as well as if people could become immune to cancer by developing an acquired immune response. Many believe that this experiment violated the bioethical principles of informed consent, non-maleficence, and beneficence.

In the 1970s, the Indian government implemented a large-scale forced sterilization program, primarily targeting poor and marginalized populations. Millions of people, especially women, underwent sterilization surgeries without their informed consent, often under pressure from local authorities or in exchange for government services.

Some pharmaceutical companies have been accused of conducting clinical trials of experimental drugs in Africa without the informed consent of participants or without providing adequate access to healthcare. These practices raise questions about the exploitation of vulnerable populations and the prioritization of commercial interests over the rights of participants.

Psychological experiments have also faced ethical criticism due to their manipulation of participants, inducing stress, anxiety, or other forms of emotional distress without informed consent. These experiments raise concerns regarding the respect for the dignity and well-being of the individuals involved.

== See also ==
- Chester M. Southam – American immunologist and oncologist
- Doctors' Trial – Post-World War II trial of German doctors for war crimes
- Duplessis Orphans – Canadian children wrongly classified as mentally ill
- Genie (feral child) – American feral child (born 1957)
- Human radiation experiments – Studies of radiation effects on humans
- Institutional review board – Type of committee that applies research ethics
- Japanese human experimentations – Japanese biological and chemical warfare unit (1936–1945)
- Medical torture – Acts of torture influenced or instigated by medical personnel
- Military medical ethics
- Nazi human experimentation – Series of human experiments in Nazi Germany
- Non-human primate experiments – Experimentation using other primate animals
- Statistical unit – Individual entity for statistical purposes
- Unethical human experimentation in the United States
- Vivisection – Experimental surgery
