= Resources for clinical ethics consultation =

Clinical ethics support services initially developed in the United States of America, following court cases such as the Karen Ann Quinlan case, which stressed the need for mechanisms to resolve ethical disputes within health care. The Joint Commission on Accreditation of Healthcare Organizations requirement for hospitals, nursing homes, and home care agencies to have a standing mechanism to address ethical issues has also fostered this development (this requirement no longer appears in the Joint Commission regulations, however).

Despite initial doubts as the possibility of importing what was initially felt to be a specificity of the US system, ethics support services have developed in many other countries, including Canada but also various countries in Europe and Asia.

In order to share experience and resources among these clinical research ethics consultation and support services, networks and platforms have increasingly developed. This page is intended to summarise existing online resources aimed at assisting new and developing clinical ethics support services. Its goal is to make these resources more easily accessible. Listing in this page does not constitute endorsement of the various contents: users will still need to judge the value of these resources for themselves.

It is reasonable to suppose that these resources will increasingly be international. Because of the role of the English language in international communication, multi-lingual resources whose languages include English are given in their English title. Those not available in English are given in their original language.

== Clinical ethics consultation networks ==
Listed by country

=== Canada ===
Provincial Health Ethics Network (Alberta)

=== United Kingdom ===
UK clinical ethics network

=== United States ===
Center for Practical Bioethics

Kansas Health Ethics Committee Network

Maryland Healthcare Ethics Committee Network

Midwest Ethics Committee Network

Johns Hopkins Research Ethics Consulting Service

== National and international guidelines on clinical ethics ==
Listed by country

=== World Medical Association ===
International code of medical ethics

=== Australia ===
Australian Medical Association code of ethics

=== Canada ===
Canadian Medical Association code of ethics

=== India ===
Medical Council of India code of ethics

=== New Zealand ===
New Zealand Medical Association code of ethics

=== Switzerland ===
Medical ethics recommendations of the Swiss Academy of Medical Sciences

=== United Kingdom ===
British Medical Association's Medical Ethics portal

British General Medical Council’s Guidance on Good Medical Practice

=== United States ===
Center for Practical Bioethics

American Medical Association code of ethics

== Clinical ethics committee guidelines ==
Many clinical ethics support services develop guidelines and advise policy within the health care setting. While the conclusions of consultations regarding individual patients are, of course, confidential, general ethical guidelines and policy advice regarding ethical difficulties which come up repeatedly in clinical care are not. Some ethics support services make these guidelines available online. Adding yours will make these resources more useful!

Listed by country

=== Switzerland ===
Recommandations du Conseil d'éthique clinique de Genève

=== United States ===
Center for Practical Bioethics

== Methodological resources ==
Some networks and consultation services have developed tools and guidelines for the practice of clinical ethics consultation, and made them available online. The following sites provide tools, documents, and advice for new or developing clinical ethics support services:

=== Switzerland ===
Recommandations on "Ethics Support in medicine" from the Swiss Academy of Medical Sciences

=== United Kingdom ===
UK Clinical Ethics Network practical guide for clinical ethics support

=== United States ===
University of Washington guide on clinical ethics committees and consultation

Veterans' Administration (US) IntegratedEthics Tools and Materials

== Online books ==
Principles of Biomedical Ethics (Tom L. Beauchamp, James F. Childress)

Ethics Consultation: from theory to practice (Mark P. Aulisio, Robert M. Arnold, Stuart J. Youngner)

Ethics Consultation (John La Puma, David L. Schiedermayer)

Cambridge textbook of bioethics (Peter A. Singer, Adrian M. Viens)

== Selected articles ==
ASBH Task Force on Health Care Ethics Consultation: Nature, Goals, and Competencies

Clinical bioethics integration, sustainability, and accountability: the Hub and Spokes Strategy by the University of Toronto Joint Centre for Bioethics

Clinical ethics, information, and communication: review of 31 cases from a clinical ethics committee (Norway)

Moral Deliberation in the Netherlands

Clinical ethics consultation in Switzerland

Report on the conference “clinical ethics consultation: theories and methods—implementation—evaluation,” February 11–15, 2008, Bochum, Germany

== Online tutorials ==
Listed by language

=== English ===
Skill Building in Ethics Case Consultation at the Neiswanger Institute

=== French ===
Études de cas du Conseil d'éthique clinique de Genève

== International and national conferences ==
International Association of Bioethics

International Conference on Clinical Ethics and Consultation

=== Canada ===
Canadian Bioethics Society

=== Switzerland ===
Société Suisse d'Éthique Biomédicale / Schweizerische Gesellschaft für Biomedizinische Ethik

=== United States ===
American Society for Bioethics and the Humanities

== See also ==
- Bioethics
- Medical Ethics
- Nursing ethics
- Autonomy
- Principlism
- Advance health care directive
- Informed Consent
- Evidence-based medical ethics
- Do not resuscitate
- Euthanasia
- Assisted Suicide
- Psychiatry#Ethics
- Arthur Caplan
- Ruth Faden
- Ross Upshur
- Joseph Fins
- Edmund D. Pellegrino
- Jonathan D. Moreno
