= Fee splitting =

Practice of sharing fees in return for referrals

Fee splitting is the practice of sharing fees with professional colleagues, such as physicians or lawyers, in return for being sent referrals.

== Fee splitting in medicine and healthcare ==
This is essentially the payment of a commission to the referrer with the express intention of ensuring that the referring doctor directs referrals of patients to the payee.

In most parts of the world, the practice is considered unethical and unacceptable, hence fee splitting is often covert. The reason it is believed not to be in the interests of patients is because it represents a conflict of interest which may adversely affect patient care and well-being, since patients will not necessarily be referred to the most appropriate doctor to provide their on-going care but will instead be referred to those doctors or hospitals with whom the referring doctor has a "fee splitting" or commission payment type of arrangement. It is also called as 'CUT' (also spoken as Cee-You-Tee) practice in many parts of the world including India for its reference to a 'cut' from the patients bill.

Many countries do not allow promotion of health services via mass media, advertisements and other direct promotions, and in a significant way, information on pricing and quality of care institutions and medicines reaches to patient through their primary care physician, many of whom indulge in a referral fee split unethical practice to refer a patient for business to a higher specialist, brand prescription and admissions.

== Fee splitting in the United States ==
The situation in the US is not entirely clear.

According to the World Medical Association,

The AMA Code provides that payment by or to a physician solely for the referral of a patient is unethical as is the acceptance by a physician of payment of any kind, and in any form, from any source such as a pharmaceutical company or pharmacist or a manufacturer of medical appliances and devices, for referring a patient to that source. Another section specifies that clinics, laboratories, hospitals or other health care facilities which compensate physicians for referral of patients are engaged in fee-splitting, which is unethical.

Among its Definitions of Unprofessional Conduct, the "West Hudson Psychiatric Society Virtual Newsletter" (1997) lists "Offering, giving or receiving a fee for the referral of a patient (fee splitting), or permitting any person other than an employee or associate to share in your fee, who has not provided an appropriate service directly under your supervision."

However, the practice, or something resembling it, tends to be tolerated – in Medicine, Money, and Morals: Physicians' Conflicts of Interest by Marc A. Rodwin, forms of fee splitting and commission paying for referrals remain common in the US and are in effect tolerated by key overseeing bodies such as the American Medical Association and Joint Commission International, or JCI.

According to their website, the Joint Commission (JCI) have no published view on the issue of fee splitting, and in fact the Joint Commission stopped trying to provide guidance on medical ethics to American hospitals many years ago, preferring to concentrate on less challenging areas of healthcare assessment, despite the vast importance of medical ethics to patient safety. It is not clear if JCI operate to a similar level of standards when working outside of the US.

The popular group marketing website Groupon and other daily deal businesses have received the green light from some U.S. state bar associations, most notably North Carolina's State Bar formal opinion. However, approved in some jurisdictions, Alabama and other state bar associations have chosen to dissent from the NC state bar ruling, and have formally ruled in opposition to allowing daily deal websites as an ethical form of group marketing. Some state bar associations have yet to formally choose an opinion.

== Fee splitting in the United Kingdom ==
Fee splitting and similar practices are considered unequivocally unacceptable for the medical profession in the United Kingdom.

The practice is considered unethical, and offenders can be disciplined and even "struck off the medical register" (that is, lose their license to practice medicine).

== Fee splitting in other countries ==
Fee splitting in the medical profession of various sorts has been alleged in Malta, Singapore, Thailand, and India.

In France, both dichotomie (the sharing of fees between physicians) and compérage (coalition between health professionals) are banned.

== See also ==
- Medical malpractice
- Medical Protection Society
- Medical tourism
- Hospital accreditation
- International healthcare accreditation
- Partnership
