= General Practice Vocational Training Scheme =

The General Practice Vocational Training Scheme (GPVTS) is the route to training of UK General Practitioners on completion of the Foundation Year Programme.

== Application ==
Recruitment to the new training scheme is coordinated nationally and applications are now submitted online at the national recruitment office (see links). Recruitment rounds begin in February and August of each year, and applications are made to a maximum of four deaneries.

== Selection ==
Selection consists of a long-list and a short-list. To be eligible for long-listing a candidate must hold a recognised primary medical qualification, to be registered with the General Medical Council and to have membership of a suitable medical defence organisation such as MPS (Medical Protection Society). Further details can be found on the national recruitment office website.

For short-listing the candidate must then successfully pass a clinical knowledge exercise consisting of Multiple Choice Questions (MCQs) Single Best Answer Questions (SBAs) and Extended Matching Questions (EMQs) together with a Competency Based assessment for which he or she must give suitable responses to 7 separate scenarios.

Those candidates who are successful at the second stage will then be invited to interview.
