= International Code of Medical Ethics =

The International Code of Medical Ethics was adopted by the General Assembly of the World Medical Association at London in 1949, and amended in 1968, 1983, and 2006. It is a code based on the Declaration of Geneva and the main goal is to establish the ethical principles of the physicians worldwide, based on his duties in general, to his patients and to his colleagues.

== History ==
After the approval of the Declaration of Geneva, the II General Assembly of the World Medical Association analysed a report on "War Crimes and Medicine". This prompted the WMA Council to appoint another Study Committee to prepare an International Code of Medical Ethics, which after an extensive discussion, was adopted in 1949 by the III General Assembly.

== Timeline (WMA meetings) ==
- 1949: Adopted. 3rd General Assembly, London
- 1968: First amendment. 22nd General Assembly, Sydney
- 1983: Second amendment. 35th General Assembly, Venice
- 2006: Third amendment. 57th General Assembly, Pilanesberg
