= Pregnant women in clinical research =

Pregnant women have historically been excluded from clinical research due to ethical concerns about harming the fetus or the perception of increased risk to the woman. Excluding pregnant women from research has also been called unethical, as it results in a scarcity of data about how therapies affect pregnant women and their fetuses. Despite consensus from bioethicists, researchers, and regulators that pregnant women should be included in clinical research, up to 95% of Phase IV clinical trials that could have included pregnant women did not, according to a 2013 review.

== Ethical considerations ==
There are several points of concern regarding clinical research with pregnant women. Some concern is related to the idea that the fetus cannot give consent to participate in the research. Some clinical research could also result in unexpected harm to the fetus. Other concerns are that pregnant women are potentially more vulnerable to negative side effects than other populations. It has also been hypothesized that pregnant women could be more susceptible to coercion than non-pregnant adults. There is insufficient data to support either of these two latter concerns, according to a 2020 review.

Conversely, the exclusion of pregnant women from clinical research has also been called unethical. The data regarding drug use and pregnancy is scarce and of poor quality. Therefore, pregnant women do not necessarily have the same access to informed, effective healthcare as other populations.

== Limiting participation ==
Due to complications from the drugs thalidomide and diethylstilbestrol in women in the 1960s and 1970s, the US Food and Drug Administration (FDA) enacted protections to limit reproductive-age women's exposure to substances that may cause birth defects. However, the guidelines were interpreted to exclude pregnant women from any clinical trial. Despite a 1994 National Academy of Medicine Report Ethical and Legal Issues of Including Women in Clinical Studies concluding that "pregnant women should be presumed to be eligible for participation in biomedical research", a 2013 publication noted that about 95% of Phase IV clinical trials that could have included pregnant women instead excluded them.

=== Effects ===
As a result of excluding pregnant women from clinical trials, the safety and efficacy of therapies cannot be evaluated for them. Over 80% of pregnant women are regularly prescribed therapies that are untested in pregnant populations. A study of medications approved by the FDA from 1980 to 2010 showed that 91% of medications for adults lacked data about the safety and efficacy for pregnant women, or determinations of risk to the fetus. In the case of highly lethal illnesses like Ebola and HIV/AIDS before the development of effective therapies, the exclusion of pregnant women from potentially life-saving clinical therapies results in them being "protected to death".

== Promoting participation ==
Regulators, researchers, and bioethicists generally agree that clinical trials should include pregnant women. Because pregnancy changes the way the body metabolizes drugs, it is otherwise difficult to predict how drugs tested in non-pregnant adults will affect pregnant women. In order to treat illness in pregnant women, clinical research must involve them.

Several projects and coalitions have formed to promote the inclusion of pregnant women in clinical research. These include the Coalition to Advance Maternal Therapeutics, which consists of twenty member organizations, and the Pregnancy Research Ethics for Vaccines, Epidemics, and New Technologies (PREVENT), a project that sought to increase the inclusion of pregnant women in vaccine trials during epidemics.

== See also ==
- Children in clinical research
- Clinical research ethics
