= Research ethics consultation =

Formal services for studies

Analogous to clinical ethics consultation, Research Ethics Consultation (REC) describes a formal way for researchers to solicit and receive expert ethical guidance related to biomedical research. The first REC service was established at the National Institutes of Health (NIH) Clinical Center in 1997. Today, most REC services are found at academic institutions, and the majority of current services were originally launched in response to the 2006 NIH Clinical and Translational Science Award program, as applicants to that program were required to have procedures in place to address ethical concerns raised by their research.

While still a young discipline with no explicit standards, individuals serving as research ethics consultants are expected to be familiar with research ethics and ethical analysis; knowledgeable about the applicable regulations, laws, and policies; and ideally also have some biomedical research experience and scientific expertise.

REC is distinct from related services, such as those of Institutional Review Boards, in that it is typically available at any point during a study (planning, conducting, interpreting, or disseminating results), and can relate to any ethical question. While little is known about the range and distribution of topics put forth for REC, such services may be particularly important and useful for studies of known regulatory and ethical uncertainty (e.g. assessment of minimal risk in pediatric studies) and frontier research for which there is little if any regulation or expert consensus. The recommendations that result from the consultation are non-binding, meaning that the researcher may choose to follow the recommendation, or to pursue a different approach.

== See also ==
- Institutional Review Board
- Ethics Committee (European Union)
- Human experimentation in the United States
- IRB: Ethics & Human Research
- Informed consent
- Data Monitoring Committees
- Office for human research protections
- Ethical problems using children in clinical trials
- National Commission for the Protection of Human Subjects of Biomedical and Behavioral Research
