= Children in clinical research =

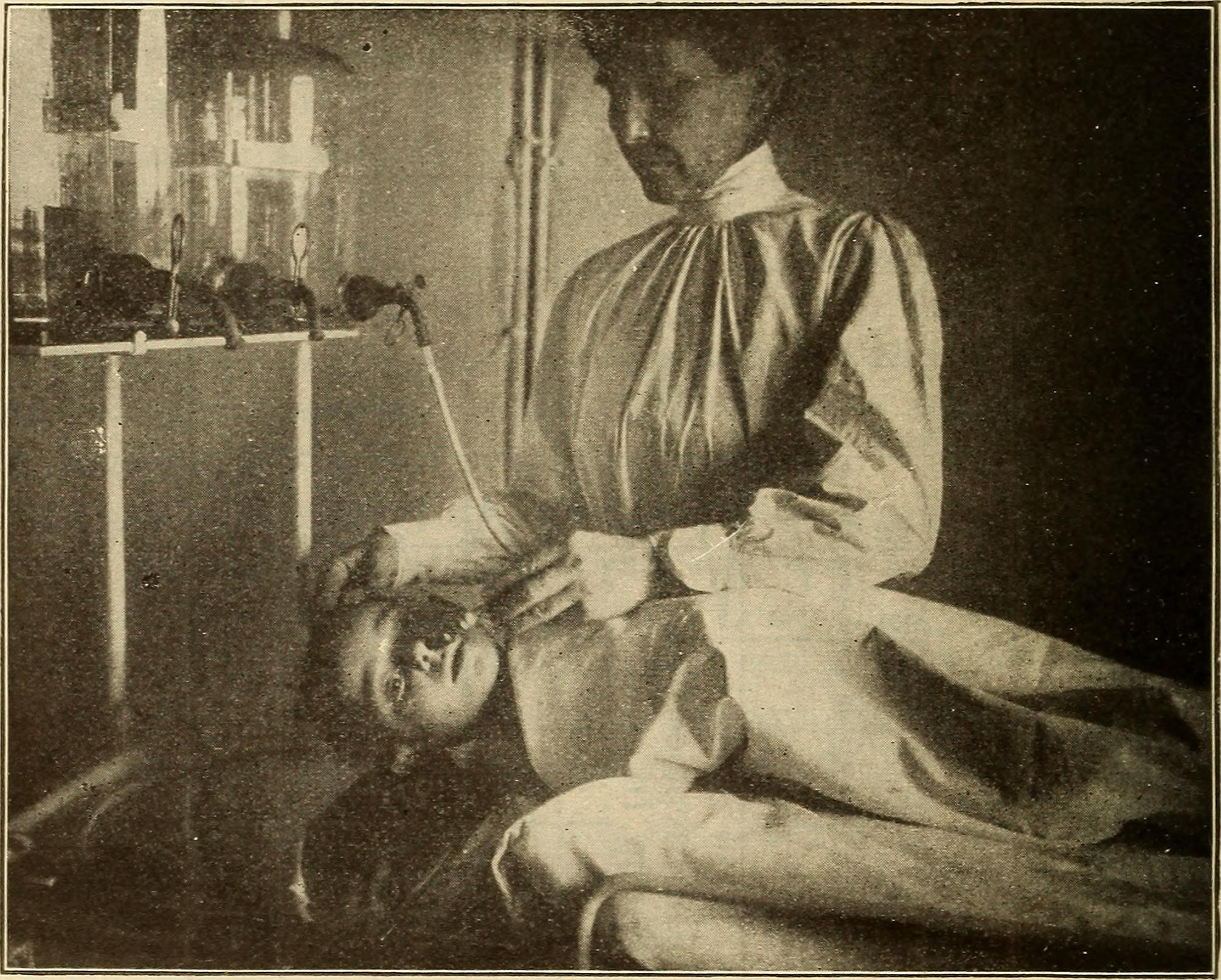
A child in the scarlet fever ward of a hospital is treated with nasal irrigation.

The participation of children in clinical trials is a practice which is typically more regulated than similar research on adults primarily due to the inability of children to give informed consent. The appropriate regulation of clinical trials on children is debated in medical ethics, where the benefits of testing the efficacy of medical treatments on children must be weighed against the harms such trials can cause to their child subjects.

Doctors and medical researchers who support clinical trials on children highlight the opportunity cost of restricting such trials, as the results such research provides may save lives and reduce suffering in future patients. Since some illnesses and medical treatments behave differently in adults and children, relying solely on research performed on adult subjects may be inadequate for the treatment of children. On the other hand, researchers also cite the potential of such research to cause harm to children, as those providing consent for minors may have incentives (such as in trials that offer payment for participation), to not act in a child's best interest.

== International standards ==
According to International Conference on Harmonisation of Technical Requirements for Registration of Pharmaceuticals for Human Use Good clinical practice, all trials involving unapproved medical treatments are reviewed for ethics before the study begins. These approving groups are typically called Institutional Review Boards (IRB) in the United States, in Europe they are typically called Independent Ethics Committees (IEC). The IRB or IEC will review not only the protocol of the trial but also the way that subjects are recruited and the consent form that they sign. These groups also examine the incentives given for participation in the trial to ensure that they are not coercive.

The World Medical Association's Declaration of Helsinki requires researchers to take special care with consent involving vulnerable subject populations which have barriers to informed consent. These groups include minors, prisoners, and the mentally ill.

== In the United States ==
U.S. Food and Drug Administration (FDA) and Office for Human Research Protections regulations require the IRB to make specific "Subpart D" determinations regarding children. To approve the trial, it must meet all of the following conditions:

- The trial must involve no more than a minor increase over minimal risk.
- The treatments must be appropriate to the condition or to medical care that the child would otherwise receive.
- The treatment must either yield "generalizable knowledge" about the specific condition that is vital for understanding or treatment.

If not all of those criteria are met, the FDA commissioner or the Secretary of Department of Health and Human Services must then consult appropriate experts and can approve the trial if both:

- The study is a reasonable opportunity to further the understanding, prevention, or alleviation of a serious problem that specifically affects children.
- "Sound ethical principles" are used.

In either case, "adequate provisions" must be made to allow the child to decide if they want to participate in the trial. The IRB must ensure that the assent process is appropriate for children. A child cannot legally give informed consent but they must be given the opportunity to decline. A parent or guardian legally consents to the child's participation. Additional safeguards exist for "wards of the state" such as orphans.

== Ethical concerns ==
Since parents often receive compensation for their children's participation in research, there are concerns that the payments received may be coercive and lead them to participate in trials which are not in their child's best interest. The IRB or IEC is expected to evaluate both the consent and assent process to ensure that children are not coerced into participation. They are also expected to evaluate the compensation given to ensure that participants are not coerced by the lure of payment.

A particular source of concern is the ethics of enrolling babies in clinical trials aimed to study new analgesic drugs and treatments: some researchers argue that babies should never be given only placebo when exposed to pain during such trials.

== Problems for the practice of medicine ==
Partially because of these issues many drugs that are used in children have never been formally studied in children. Many drugs work differently in children. Reye's syndrome, for example, is a potentially fatal complication of aspirin therapy in children that is very rare in adults.

The 2002 Best Pharmaceuticals for Children Act, allowed the FDA to request National Institutes of Health-sponsored testing for pediatric drug testing, although these requests are subject to NIH funding constraints. Patent term extensions were offered to manufacturers that conducted trials of drugs that would be used in children. The Pediatric Research Equity Act of 2003, Congress codified the FDA's authority to mandate manufacturer-sponsored pediatric drug trials for certain drugs as a "last resort" if incentives and publicly funded mechanisms proved inadequate.

== Trials in Irish institutions ==
During the 1960s and 1970s, a series of vaccine trials were undertaken on 123 young children at several residential institutions in Ireland. The trials were conducted under the auspices of researchers at University College Dublin. Subsequent investigations by the Irish government, including the Commission to Inquire into Child Abuse, revealed a broad lack of documentation pertaining to the conduct of the trials at the institutions and the nature of any informed consent, as well as a failure to follow up with the participants. The commission's investigations in this area were abruptly halted after legal action was taken by the researchers involved.

== See also ==
- Clinical trials
- Ethics
- Ethics in clinical research
- Human experimentation in the United States
- Philosophy of Healthcare
- Pregnant women in clinical research
