= Formula Comitis Archiatrorum =

Formula Comitis Archiatrorum is the earliest known code of medical ethics. It was written in the 5th century, during the reign of the Ostrogothic king Theodoric, and is preserved in the works of Cassiodorus. It demands from physicians that they widen and deepen their knowledge and enacts the consultation with other physicians.
