= Erlanger baby =

Fetus of a brain-dead pregnant woman

The Erlanger baby was the fetus of a brain-dead pregnant woman who received weeks of intensive medical treatment at Erlangen University Hospital in 1992 to enable her unborn child to survive. Despite all efforts, the fetus died.

The case led to numerous discussions about the legal and ethical aspects of this procedure and caused a "firestorm of controversy" all over Germany and German-speaking countries with reactions in Europe and worldwide.

== Situation ==
On October 5, 1992, an 18-year-old woman, fifteen weeks pregnant, suffered a traumatic brain injury in a car accident; her left eye socket and skull bone were shattered. Her brain death was diagnosed at Erlangen University Hospital on October 8. As the woman's internal organs were still functional and the fetus had not been injured in the accident, the doctors continued the intensive medical measures to save the life of the unborn child.

In the weeks that followed, the brain-dead pregnant woman's condition deteriorated increasingly. The injured eye had to be removed due to inflammation. Finally, on November 16, the child died during a spontaneous abortion. The intensive care measures were discontinued on the same day.

== Controversy ==
The case triggered heated discussions in the German public. The focus was on the question of the right to die with dignity. The doctors had only unnecessarily prolonged the young woman's dying process, although the chances of the foetus surviving for months were slim. Alice Schwarzer, a German journalist and feminist, described the case in Emma as an "Erlanger human experiment", pointing out especially the practice of using the woman's body as an "incubator". For many women, the issue represented an example of "men maintaining power over a woman's body", also because the committee that had taken the crucial medical decisions consisted only of men. In contrast, the Hersbruck district court, which had been called upon to appoint a guardian, stated in its decision on October 16 that the right to life took precedence in the "weighing of interests to be carried out between the post-mortem protection of the dead woman's personality and the unborn child's independent right to life".

The doctors' conduct in their decision-making was also criticized: Instead of consulting the hospital's ethics committee, decisions on how to proceed were made in a small circle. The parents of the brain-dead woman also felt ill-informed and ignored by the doctors, which prompted the father to contact the Bild newspaper on October 9.

Because of the broad public debate about the case, the German Language Society placed the term Erlanger Baby in twelfth place in the 1992 Word of the Year competition.

== Literature ==
- Echinger, Karolina (2014): Schwangerschaft in Grenzbereichen von Medizin und Ethik. Die „Erlanger Fälle" 1992 und 2007. Diss. med. Erlangen.
- Eric Hilgendorf: Scheinargumente in der Abtreibungsdiskussion – am Beispiel des Erlanger Schwangerschaftsfalls. In: Neue Juristische Wochenschrift, Jahrgang 1996, S. 758, ISSN 0341-1915
- Fouse, Gary C. (2005): Erlangen. An American's History of a German Town. University Press of America, Lanham, Md. et al. (p. 328)
- Frewer, Andreas (2022): Der Fall des „Erlanger Baby" als Spiegel. Historische Kontroversen zur Medizinethik und Probleme der Perspektive. In: Gründerzeit der Medizinethik (2022), S. 231-261.
- Frewer, Andreas (Hrsg.) (2022): Gründerzeit der Medizinethik. Hans-Bernhard Wuermeling und die Fachentwicklung ins 21. Jahrhundert. Steiner Verlag, Stuttgart.
- Frewer, Andreas (2025): Clinical Ethics in Germany. The “Erlangen Baby” Case and its Impact on Institutionalization. In: Yearbook Ethics in Clinics 17 (2025), pp. 281-288 [Open Access].
- Kiesecker, Regine (1996): Die Schwangerschaft einer Toten: Strafrecht an der Grenze von Leben und Tod. Der Erlanger und der Stuttgarter Baby-Fall (Recht und Medizin, Band 34). Peter Lang, Frankfurt/M. u.a.
- Monika Gruber: Die strafrechtliche Problematik des „Erlanger-Baby-Falls". In: Claus Roxin (Hrsg.): Medizinstrafrecht – im Spannungsfeld von Medizin, Ethik und Strafrecht. Boorberg, Stuttgart 2001. S. 175–198. ISBN 3415027910
- Wuermeling, Hans-Bernhard (1994): Brain-death and pregnancy. Forensic Science International 69 (1994), pp. 243–245.
- Wuermeling, Hans-Bernhard (1993c): Überleben des Foetus bei hirntoter Mutter.[Conference report]. Zeitschrift für ärztliche Fortbildung 87, 10-11 (1993), S. 845-847.
