= Evidence-based medical ethics =

Practice that uses ethical principles and evidence-based medicine

Evidence-based medical ethics is a form of medical ethics that uses knowledge from ethical principles, legal precedent, and evidence-based medicine to draw solutions to ethical dilemmas in the health care field. Sometimes this is also referred to as argument-based medical ethics. It is also the title of the book Evidence-Based Medical Ethics: Cases for Practice-Based Learning by John E. Snyder and Candace C. Gauthier, published by Humana-Springer Press in 2008 (ISBN 978-1-60327-245-2). While seen as a promising new approach to bioethical problem solving by many, it has also been criticized for misrepresenting ethical problems as problems that can be solved by appeal to the evidence as the "bottom line".
