= United Nations Principles of Medical Ethics =

Code of medical ethics adopted in 1982

The UN Principles of Medical Ethics is a code of medical ethics relating to the "roles of health personnel in the protection of persons against torture and other cruel, inhuman or degrading treatment or punishment.", adopted by the United Nations on 18 December 1982 at the 111th plenary meeting of the United Nations General Assembly.

This document consists of 6 Principles. In the preamble, the General Assembly warns that “not infrequently members of medical profession or other health personnel are engaged in activities which are difficult to reconcile with medical ethics.”

Principle 1 of the above instrument has made it the duty of the medical personnel, particularly physicians, not to discriminate against those who are “imprisoned or detained.” It is a “gross contravention of medical ethics” for them “to engage, actively or passively, in acts which constitute participation in, complicity in, incitement to or attempts to commit torture or other cruel, inhuman or degrading treatment or punishment.” (Principle 2) They must not apply “their knowledge and skills in order to assist in the interrogation of prisoners” or to certify their fitness for punishment. (Principle 4) They should not participate in “restraining a prisoner” unless it is necessary on medical grounds. (Principle 5)

The widespread use of torture and other inhuman and usual treatment as an aftereffect of the terrorist incident of 11 September 2001, has made the UN Principles of Medical Ethics more relevant. What follows is an excerpt from an article by American author and psychiatrist Dr. Robert J. Lifton:

“There is increasing evidence that U.S. doctors, nurses and medics have been complicit in torture and other illegal procedures in Iraq, Afghanistan and Guantanamo Bay. Such medical complicity suggests still another disturbing dimension of this broadening scandal. We know that medical personnel have failed to report to higher authorities wounds that were clearly caused by torture and that they have neglected to take steps to interrupt this torture. In addition, they have turned over prisoners' medical records to interrogators who could use them to exploit the prisoners' weaknesses or vulnerabilities. We have not yet learned the extent of medical involvement in delaying and possibly falsifying the death certificates of prisoners who have been killed by torturers.”

While condemning the practice of torture in jails, the Executive Director of the Physicians for Human Rights has referred to the lack of effective guidelines for medical professionals dealing with prisoners. He has reiterated that efforts must include “a robust examination of guidance provided to health professionals who work in settings where interrogations occur, since it appears that guidance for medical personnel is almost entirely lacking.”
