= Declaration of Tokyo =

Guidelines banning the practice of forced feeding

The Declaration of Tokyo is a set of international guidelines for physicians concerning torture and other cruel, inhuman or degrading treatment or punishment in relation to detention and imprisonment, which was adopted in October 1975 during the 29th General assembly of the World Medical Association, and later editorially updated by the WMA in France, May 2005 and 2006. It declares torture to be "contrary to the laws of humanity", and antithetical to the "higher purpose" of the physician, which is to "alleviate the distress of his or her fellow human being." The policy states that doctors should refuse to participate in, condone, or give permission for torture, degradation, or cruel treatment of prisoners or detainees. According to the policy, a prisoner who refuses to eat should not be fed artificially against their will, provided that they are judged to be rational.
