= Military medical ethics =

Military medical ethics (MME) is a specialized branch of medical ethics with implications for military ethics. Both are primarily fields of applied ethics, the study of moral values and judgments as they apply to the specific contexts of medicine and military affairs, respectively. MME encompasses the practical application of ethics by military physicians and other healthcare practitioners to dilemmas in military clinical and public health settings in which the patients may be friendly or enemy personnel or in which civilians are affected by military operations.

== Overview ==
Within a garrison (peacetime or non-deployed) setting, precepts of MME may not differ much from medical ethics in a civilian context and usually employ the same decision-making processes. (Military physicians in the United States, for example, are licensed by at least one of the state medical boards and so are required to practice medicine according to the ethical stipulations of that state.) There is an intrinsic dichotomy, however, between medicine's healing mission and a military's (sometimes) destructive operations. Because military operations may result in the injury or death of enemy personnel (often deliberately so) and may involve the detention and interrogation of captured enemy personnel, medical ethics considerations for clinical providers assigned or attached to a military unit in a deployment or combat situation cannot always be identical to those in the civilian world. Ethical conflicts may emerge in the tension between responsibilities to the patient and duties to the command structure. The degree to which principles of medical ethics may justifiably be informed by, or even altered to accommodate, issues of national security is controversial.

== Historical background ==
Discussions of MME often take as a point of departure the lessons to be learned from the perversion of medical practice by military physicians and others in the period leading up to and during World War II in Germany and Japan. They may also entail the more recently revealed Cold War radiation experiments undertaken by the United States government. Such discussions often center upon questions of whether these widely deplored activities of the past can be reasonably compared to present-day MME dilemmas.
