= Chester M. Southam =

American immunologist and oncologist

- Born: October 4, 1919
- Died: April 5, 2002 (aged 82)
- Education: University of Idaho (BS, MS); Columbia University College of Physicians and Surgeons (MD)
- Known for: Non-consensual injection of cancer cells into healthy patients
- Scientific career
- Fields: Oncology
- Workplaces: Memorial Sloan Kettering; Cornell University Medical College; Thomas Jefferson University

Chester Milton Southam (October 4, 1919 – April 5, 2002) was an immunologist and oncologist at Memorial Sloan Kettering Cancer Center and Cornell University Medical College. He later moved to Thomas Jefferson University and worked there until the end of his career. He ran experiments involving the injection of live cancer cells into human subjects, without proper disclosure or consent. His work has been labeled as highly dangerous and unethical by both modern scientists and his contemporaries.

== Education ==
Southam earned a Bachelor of Science degree and a master's degree from the University of Idaho and his medical degree from Columbia University College of Physicians and Surgeons, graduating in 1947. He became an intern at Presbyterian Hospital in New York City in 1947.

== Career ==
In the following year Southam was promoted from clinical fellow to attending physician at the Memorial Hospital for Cancer and also received a promotion from research fellow to full member at the Chief Division Virology/Immunology. He received a fellowship for the Damon Runyon Cancer Research Foundation in 1949. He joined the faculty of Cornell University Medical College in 1951 and was eventually promoted to full professor. In 1971, Southam left his positions at Memorial Sloan Kettering and Cornell to move to Thomas Jefferson University Hospital, where he headed the Division of Medical Oncology from 1971 to 1979 and served as a professor of medicine and an attending physician in the Department of Medicine from 1971 to 1995. Southam served as president of the American Association for Cancer Research in 1968–1969.

=== Non-consensual patients ===
From the mid-1950s to the mid-1960s, Southam conducted clinical research on people without their informed consent, in which he injected cancer cells (HeLa cells) into their skin, to see if their immune system would reject the cancer cells or if the cells would grow. He did this to patients under his care or others' care, and to prisoners. In 1963, doctors Avir Kagan, David Leichter and Perry Fersko of Jewish Chronic Disease Hospital objected to the lack of consent in his experiments and reported him to the Regents of the University of the State of New York which found him guilty of fraud, deceit, and unprofessional conduct, and in the end he was placed on probation for a year. Southam's research was conducted in an era when cancer research was closely followed in the mainstream media; his experiments and the case at the Regents were reported in The New York Times and declared highly unethical.

=== West Nile Virus ===
In the 1950s, Southam also tested the West Nile Virus as a potential virotherapy; he injected it into over 100 cancer patients who had terminal cancer and few treatment options. This work had some good results and was also reported in The New York Times, but some people he injected got severe cases of West Nile fever; he went on to do further research to see if he could "train" the virus to kill cancer without the common side effects of chemotherapy.

== Personal life and death ==
Southam married Anna Lenore Skow in 1939. They attended Columbia University College of Physicians and Surgeons together and graduated in 1947. They had three children: Lawrence, Lenore, and Arthur. Anna became an obstetrician-gynecologist. Southam died on April 5, 2002, and was survived by his second wife, Gertrude, the three children from his first marriage, and two stepchildren.
