= Declaration of Geneva =

Oath of ethics taken by physicians; last amended 2017

The Declaration of Geneva was adopted by the General Assembly of the World Medical Association at Geneva in 1948, amended in 1968, 1983, 1994, editorially revised in 2005 and 2006 and amended in 2017.

It is a declaration of a physician's dedication to the humanitarian goals of medicine, a declaration that was especially important in view of the medical crimes which had just been committed in German-occupied Europe. The Declaration of Geneva was intended as a revision of the Hippocratic Oath to a formulation of that oath's moral truths that could be comprehended and acknowledged in a modern way. Unlike the case of the Oath of Hippocrates, the World Medical Association calls the statement a "pledge".

== Creation ==
During the post World War II era and immediately after its foundation, the World Medical Association (WMA) showed concern over the state of medical ethics in general and all over the world, taking the responsibility for setting ethical guidelines for the world physicians. The details of the Nazi Doctors' Trial at Nuremberg which ended August 1947 and the revelations about what the Imperial Japanese Army had done at Unit 731 in China during the war clearly demonstrated the need for reform, and for a re-affirmed set of guidelines regarding both human rights and the rights of patients.

A study committee was appointed to prepare a "Charter of Medicine" which could be adopted as an oath or promise that every doctor in the world would make upon receiving their medical degree or diploma. It took two years of intensive study of the oaths and promises submitted by member associations to draft a modernized wording of the ancient oath of Hippocrates which was sent for consideration at the WMA's second general assembly in Geneva in 1948. The medical vow was adopted and the assembly agreed to name it the "Declaration of Geneva." This document was adopted by the World Medical Association only three months before the United Nations General Assembly adopted the Universal Declaration of Human Rights (1948) which provides for the security of the person.

== Declaration ==
The Declaration of Geneva (2017), as currently published by the World Medical Association reads:

AS A MEMBER OF THE MEDICAL PROFESSION:

- I SOLEMNLY PLEDGE to consecrate my life to the service of humanity;
- THE HEALTH AND WELL-BEING OF MY PATIENT will be my first consideration;
- I WILL RESPECT the autonomy and dignity of my patient;
- I WILL MAINTAIN the utmost respect for human life;
- I WILL NOT PERMIT considerations of age, disease or disability, creed, ethnic origin, gender, nationality, political affiliation, race, sexual orientation, social standing or any other factor to intervene between my duty and my patient;
- I WILL RESPECT the secrets that are confided in me, even after the patient has died;
- I WILL PRACTICE my profession with conscience and dignity and in accordance with good medical practice;
- I WILL FOSTER the honour and noble traditions of the medical profession;
- I WILL GIVE to my teachers, colleagues, and students the respect and gratitude that is their due;
- I WILL SHARE my medical knowledge for the benefit of the patient and the advancement of healthcare;
- I WILL ATTEND TO my own health, well-being, and abilities in order to provide care of the highest standard;
- I WILL NOT USE my medical knowledge to violate human rights and civil liberties, even under threat;
- I MAKE THESE PROMISES solemnly, freely and upon my honour.

=== Changes from original ===
The original oath read "My colleagues will be my brothers," later changed to "sisters and brothers." Until 1994 it also read "I will maintain the utmost respect for human life, from the time of its conception (...)". Age, disability, gender, and sexual orientation have been added as factors that must not interfere with a doctor's duty to a patient; some rephrasing of existing elements has occurred. Secrets are to remain confidential "even after the patient has died." The violation of "human rights and civil liberties" replaces the violation of "the laws of humanity" as a forbidden use of medical knowledge. "The health" in general of a patient is now the doctor's first consideration compared to the "health and life" as stated in the original declaration. This was apparently changed to free the medical profession from extending life at all costs. The 68th WMA General Assembly in October 2017 approved revisions including: respecting the autonomy of the patient; mutual respect for teachers, colleagues and students physicians to share medical knowledge for the benefit of their patients and the advancement of healthcare; a requirement for physicians to attend to their own health as well as their patients. Furthermore, the revised text is meant to be used by all active physicians ("as member of the medical profession") while before the text was used by beginners only ("At the time of being admitted as a member of the medical profession").

=== Discussions of the declaration changes ===
The Declaration of Geneva was originally adopted by the WMA General Assembly in 1948 right after one year of the formation of World Medical Association, and has undergone a series of amendments throughout the years, until 2006 and the latest amendments, made at the 68th WMA General Assembly in Chicago in October 2017, make several significant additions. The most notable addition was a result of ongoing lobbying by New Zealand doctors' well-being advocate Dr Sam Hazledine, of MedWorld; in order to provide a high standard of care to patients, doctors must look after their own health.

The newly revised Declaration of Geneva, released in October 2017, contains some modifications in terms of words throughout but also three entirely new points:

- I WILL RESPECT the autonomy and dignity of my patient.
- I WILL SHARE my medical knowledge for the benefit of the patient and the advancement of healthcare.
- I WILL ATTEND TO my own health, well-being, and abilities in order to provide care of the highest standard.

The new Geneva Declaration version acknowledges respect for human rights of patients, the value of sharing knowledge with the community and profession, and the right and obligation of physicians to care for themselves, and to maintain their abilities for the benefit of society.

== Timeline (WMA meetings) ==
- 1948: Adopted. 2nd General Assembly, Geneva
- 1968: First amendment. 22nd General Assembly, Sydney
- 1983: Second amendment. 35th General Assembly, Venice
- 1994: Third amendment. 46th General Assembly, Stockholm
- 2005: Editorial Revision. 170th Council Session, Divonne-les-Bains
- 2006: Editorial Revision. 173rd Council Session, Divonne-les-Bains
- 2017: Fourth amendment. 68th WMA General Assembly, Chicago

== See also ==
- Belmont Report
- Command responsibility
- Declaration of Helsinki
- Human experimentation in the United States
- Informed consent
- International Conference on Harmonisation of Technical Requirements for Registration of Pharmaceuticals for Human Use
- Louis Lasagna
- Nuremberg Code
- Nuremberg Principles
