= Medical Protection Society =

British mutual protectiion organization

Coordinates: 53°47′32″N 1°32′55″W

The Medical Protection Society (MPS) is one of the three UK mutual protection organisations for medical, dental and healthcare professionals. (Dentists are covered through its subsidiary company Dental Protection.)

It protects and supports the professional interests of more than 300,000 members around the world (including the United Kingdom, Australia, Ireland, Malaysia, Singapore, Hong Kong, South Africa, New Zealand plus the Caribbean and Bermuda). Members of MPS can benefit from access to indemnity, expert advice and peace of mind. Advisers are on hand to talk through a question or concern.

MPS' in-house experts assist with the wide range of legal and ethical problems that arise from professional practice. This includes clinical negligence claims, complaints, medical and dental council inquiries, legal and ethical dilemmas, disciplinary procedures, inquests and fatal accident inquiries. MPS is not an insurance company. All the benefits of membership of MPS are discretionary as set out in the Memorandum and Articles of Association.

MPS was founded in 1892, with just 13 original members all practising in the home counties of England, and in 2020 had over 300,000 members worldwide.

== Indemnity ==
MPS aims to help doctors with ethical and legal problems that arise from their clinical practice. Members of MPS look to the organization for medical legal advice and indemnity for the legal costs in defence of their professional reputations. MPS also pays out damages for clinical negligence. However, it is not an insurance company; MPS offers funds and other services to its membership body at the discretion of a council of representative members.

The council's obligations and powers are set out in the Memorandum and Articles of Association. A copy of this is sent to members when they join MPS.

== Functions ==
Some of the services provided by MPS include:

- Advice and legal representation - The right to request advice and legal representation for coroner's inquests, disciplinary and regulatory proceedings and criminal investigations related to your professional practice
- Clinical negligence - The right to request indemnity for clinical negligence claims (not covered by NHS indemnity) and Good Samaritan acts worldwide
- Complaints support - Help to respond and to resolve patient complaints
- Medical legal advice - Medical legal advice line including out of hours emergency support 24/7
- Expert legal team - Access to a dedicated expert legal team which may include clinical negligence solicitors, medicolegal consultants and professional claims managers
- Professional development workshops and online courses - Workshops, online courses and webinars with accredited CPD to develop your communication and risk management skills
- Risk management resources - Access to online publications and case reports
- Confidential counselling service - Access to confidential counselling service to support you through a stressful case or claim
- Help with unwanted media attention - Expert support including preparing statements and responding to the media on your behalf
- Lobbying - To bring about a sensible regulatory environment to provide a safer environment for patients and healthcare professionals.

The MPS has offices in Leeds, London and Edinburgh and is present in several overseas locations including New Zealand and Australia.
