= World Medical Association =

International Association of Medical Doctors

- Formation: 17 September 1947; 79 years ago
- Purpose: International Organization
- Location: Ferney-Voltaire, France
- Members: 117 Constituent Members and 3056 Associate Members (2026)
- President: Dr Jacqueline KITULU (2025-2026)
- Secretary General: Ramin W. Parsa-Parsi (2026-present); Otmar Kloiber (2005-2026)
- Key people: Dr Ashok PHILIP (Immediate Past President); Jung Yul PARK (President Elect)
- Website: wma.net

The World Medical Association (WMA) is an international and independent confederation of free professional medical associations representing physicians worldwide. WMA was formally established on September 17, 1947 and has grown to 117 national medical associations, as of 2026, with 3056 Associate Members, including Junior Doctors and medical students. and more than 10 million physicians. WMA is in official relations with the World Health Organization (WHO) and seeks close collaboration with the UN Special Rapporteur on the right to physical and mental health.

== History ==
The WMA was founded on 17 September 1947, when physicians from 27 countries met at the First General Assembly of the WMA in Paris. This organization was built from an idea born in the House of the British Medical Association in 1945, within a meeting organized in London to initiate plans for an international medical organization to replace l'Association Professionnelle Internationale des Médecins", which had suspended its activities because of World War II.

In order to facilitate financial support from its member associations, in 1948, the executive board, known as the Council, established the Secretariat of the WMA in New York City in order to provide close liaison with the United Nations and its various agencies. The WMA Secretariat remained in New York City until 1974 when for reasons of economy, and in order to operate within the vicinity of Geneva-based international organizations (WHO, ILO, ICN, ISSA, etc.) it was transferred to its present location in Ferney-Voltaire, France. The WMA members gathered in an annual meeting, which from 1962 was named "World Medical Assembly."

Since its beginning WMA has shown concern over the state of medical ethics in general and over the world, and worked on a modernized wording of the ancient oath of Hippocrates, which was sent for consideration at the II General Assembly in Geneva in 1948. The medical vow was adopted and the Assembly agreed to name it the "Declaration of Geneva."Also in the same II General Assembly a report on "War Crimes and Medicine" was received. This prompted the Council to appoint another Study Committee to prepare an International Code of Medical Ethics, which after an extensive discussion, was adopted in 1949 by the III General Assembly.

== Governance ==
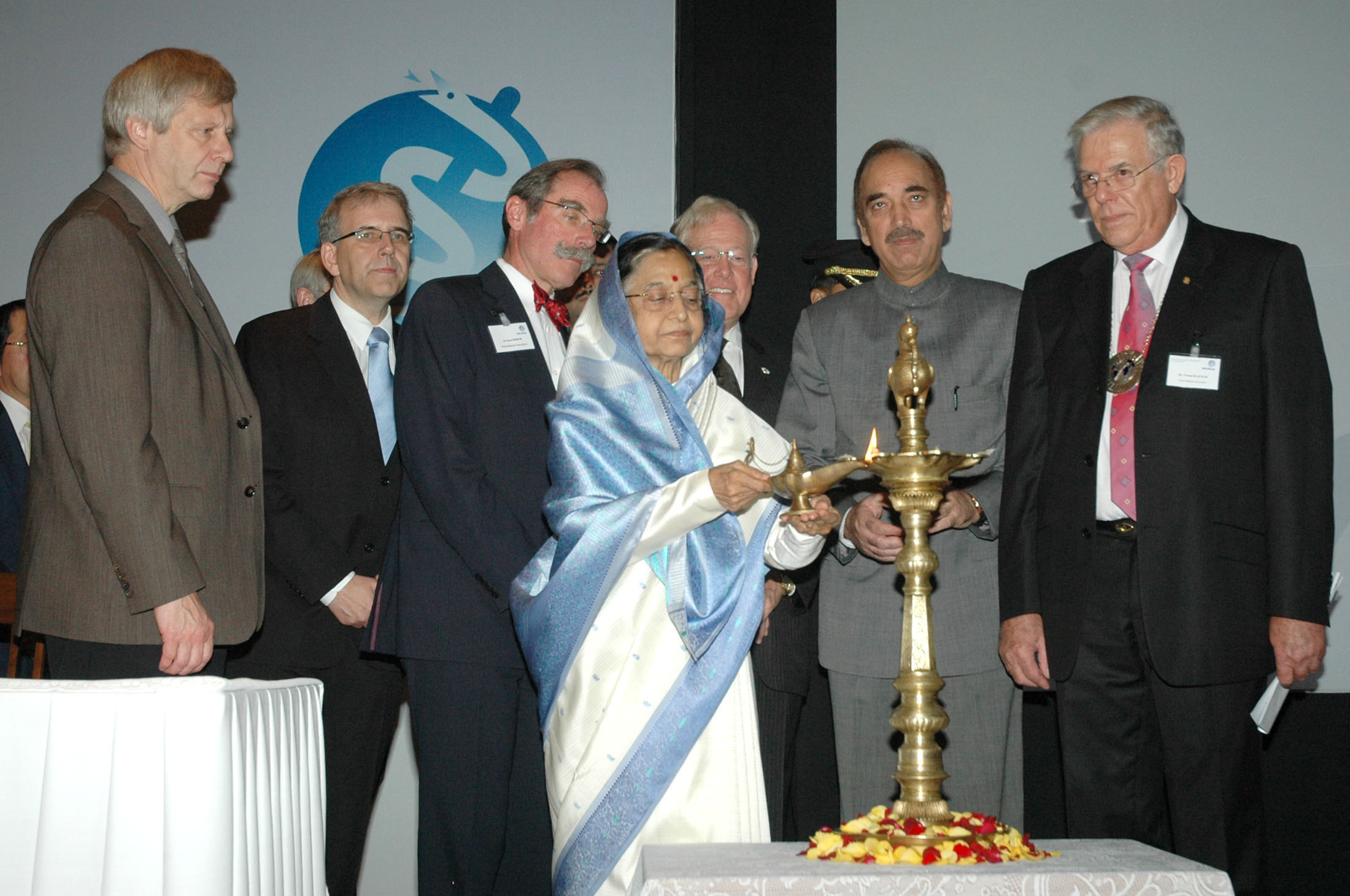
The President of India, Smt. Pratibha Devisingh Patil lighting the lamp to inaugurate the General Assembly of World Medical Association, in New Delhi on October 16, 2009

=== General Assembly ===
The main decision-making body of the WMA is the General Assembly, which meets annually and is formed by delegations from the National Member Associations, officers and members of the Council of the WMA, and representatives of the Associate Members (Associate Members are individual physicians who wish to join the WMA).

In October 2026, the IMA OUT! coalition publicly urged the World Medical Association to revoke the Israeli Medical Association's membership. At the WMA's general assembly in Rotterdam, demonstrators displayed 81 medical uniforms bearing the names of Palestinian healthcare professionals who, according to the campaign, had been detained by Israel. The coalition also announced that it had presented a petition—endorsed by more than 6,500 healthcare workers—requesting the suspension of the Israeli association.

=== Council ===
The Assembly elects the WMA Council every two years with representatives drawn from each of the six WMA regions, namely Africa, Asia, Europe, Latin America, North America and the Pacific. It also elects the WMA president annually, who is the Ceremonial Head of the WMA. The President, President Elect and Immediate Past President form the Presidium that is available to speak for the WMA and represent it officially.

Every two years, the WMA Council, excluding the Presidium, elects a Chairperson who is the political head of the organization. As Chief Executive of the operational units of the WMA, the Secretary-General is in full-time employment at the Secretariat, appointed by the WMA Council.

== Secretariat ==
The WMA Secretariat is situated in Ferney-Voltaire, France, near Geneva. Since 2026, Dr. Ramin W. Parsa-Parsi is the Secretary-General.

== Notable Policies ==
The most well known policy of the WMA is the Declaration of Helsinki, the first set of international research guidelines for clinical trials involving human participants. Other notable policies include the Declaration of Taipei, which addresses Biobanks and Healthcare data, the Declaration of Tokoyo, which provides guidelines for physicians to prevent torture, and the Declaration of Geneva, known as the modern hippocratic oath.

== Official languages ==
English, French, and Spanish are the official languages of the association since its creation.

== Membership ==
The WMA has the following classes of membership:

- Constituent Membership: Mainly applies for members who are typically National Associations of Physicians from different countries in the world (sometimes these organizations are called National Medical Associations). Such associations are broadly representative of the physicians of their country by virtue of their membership. They range from chambers to orders, from colleges to private associations. Some of these have compulsory membership and some are trade unions.
- Associate Membership: Applies for Individual physicians that want to join the WMA and who have voting rights at the Annual Associate Members Meeting and the right to participate in the General Assembly through the chosen representatives of the Associate Members.
- Other classes of Membership: can also be established by the Assembly, should it be appropriate and in the best interest of the WMA.

== Controversies ==
During the World Medical Association General Assembly in Reykjavík in early October 2018, members of the Canadian Medical Association stated that parts of the speech by WMA's incoming president Leonid Eidelman had been plagiarized from a speech made in 2014 by Chris Simpson (cardiologist) who was then the president of CMA. The incumbent president Gigi Osler told the group that part of the address was "copied word for word" from Simpson's speech. "Multiple other parts of the speech were also copied from various websites, blogs and news articles, without proper appropriate attribution to the authors", she latter added in a statement. A motion by Canada at the Assembly to call on Eidelman to resign was not successful. On 6 October, the CMA resigned; their press release stated that the decision was made because WMA was not upholding ethical standards.

In an email to The Canadian Press, WMA spokesman Nigel Duncan said that Eidelman's speech had been written by others and that he did not know that it might contain plagiarism. A WMA source also told The Canadian Press that Eidelman apologized at the general assembly, after the Canadian delegates had departed; he "acknowledge[d] that part of his speech was taken from Simpson", and most delegates "accepted his apology" for the mistake.

The World Medical Association has faced criticism from some scholars and observers who argue that, despite its influence in global medical ethics, it has not taken sufficiently strong action on certain human rights and professional ethics issues, including its historical response to apartheid-era South Africa and the enforcement of ethical standards among member associations.

== See also ==
- Council for International Organizations of Medical Sciences (CIOMS)
- Declaration of Geneva
- Declaration of Helsinki
- Declaration of Tokyo. Guidelines for Physicians Concerning Torture and other Cruel, Inhuman or Degrading Treatment or Punishment in Relation to Detention and Imprisonment
- International Code of Medical Ethics
- Standing Committee of European Doctors
- World Health Professions Alliance (WHPA)
- World Health Organization (WHO)
