= 2008 Irish pork crisis =

International recall of Irish pork

County Carlow was the location of the source of the crisis

County Tyrone was reported as the origin of the oil used that create the crisis.

The Irish pork crisis of 2008 was a dioxin contamination incident in Ireland that led to an international recall of pork products from Ireland produced between September and early December of that year. It was disclosed in early December 2008 that contaminated animal feed supplied by one Irish manufacturer to thirty-seven beef farms and nine pig farms across the Republic of Ireland, and eight beef farms and one dairy farm in Northern Ireland, had caused the contamination of pork with between 80 and 200 times the EU's recommended limit for dioxins and dioxin-like PCBs i.e. 0.2 ng/g TEQ fat (0.2 ppb). The Food Safety Authority of Ireland moved on 6 December to recall from the market all Irish pork products dating from 1 September 2008 to that date. The contaminated feed that was supplied to forty-five beef farms across the island was judged to have caused no significant public health risk, accordingly no recall of beef was ordered. Also affected was a dairy farm in Northern Ireland; some milk supplies were withdrawn from circulation. Processors refused to resume the slaughter of pigs until they received financial compensation.

Pork supplies to a total of twenty-three countries were affected, thirteen within the European Union and the remainder outside in an area across at least three continents. Countries affected include: Italy, Germany, the Netherlands, Poland, Sweden, Denmark, Belgium, Estonia, the UK, France, Portugal, Cyprus, Romania, Russia, the United States, Canada, Switzerland, China, South Korea, Japan and Republic of Singapore.

It is now suspected that the oil that contaminated the offending pig feed with dioxins came from County Tyrone. Some reports suggest the recovery of the Irish pork market would take up to a decade. The Irish government has been criticised over its handling of the incident.

On 18 December 2008, it was disclosed that the beef samples from the affected farms had dioxin levels between 100 and 400 times the legal limit. However the Irish authorities insisted that the threat to public health from Irish beef products, even though the dioxin levels were higher than in the affected pork, was insignificant. On 25 January 2009, Chinese quarantine authorities seized over 23 tonnes of frozen and contaminated Irish pork which was imported by a company in the city of Suzhou in October 2008. On 28 January 2009, Joint Oireachtas Committee on Agriculture was told by Indaver Ireland managing director John Ahern that Ireland could "sleepwalk" into another pork crisis if the Minister for the Environment, John Gormley, continued with his plans to commence widespread use of mechanical biological treatment.

== Pork ==
=== Background ===
An illustration of the measured dioxin levels in Irish pork and beef relative to the legal limit. The smallest green circle represents the legal limit. The other circles' areas are relative to the green circle and represent the lowest (80 times the legal limit) and highest (400 times the legal limit) levels of dioxin found in Irish pork and beef.

On the evening of 6 December, the Food Safety Authority of Ireland ordered the recall, withdrawal and destruction of all Irish pork products dating back to 1 September. It was announced that "dioxins & dioxin like PCBs", a group of highly toxic synthetic halogenated organic compounds, had been discovered in pork at levels between 80 and 200 times the EU's recommended safety limits. This contamination, which was first realised on 1 December, came about as a result of contamination of pig feed. The positive results for dioxins and dioxin like PCBs were confirmed on the afternoon of 6 December and announced within hours. The Irish general public were advised to destroy all their purchased pork products as Ireland's Department of Agriculture and the Food Safety Authority had initiated an investigation. Contaminated feed was used at as many as forty-six farms in the Republic of Ireland of which thirty-seven raised cattle for beef and nine produced pork. Additionally, contaminated feed was used on eight cattle farms in Northern Ireland. Beef products, from cattle who may have been fed contaminated feed, were judged to be safe and were not recalled from market. One cattle farm in Northern Ireland used the feed for beef and dairy cattle, and milk from this farm was removed from the food supply.

Following the discovery, the Taoiseach, Brian Cowen and the Irish Minister for Agriculture, Fisheries and Food, Brendan Smith attended talks at the Department of Agriculture. Alongside them were the Minister for Health, Mary Harney and Ministers of State Trevor Sargent and Mary Wallace. The opposition party Fine Gael's spokesperson for agriculture, Michael Creed described the discovery as "potentially the biggest threat to the agriculture food sector since the outbreak of foot-and-mouth disease".

On the afternoon of 7 December, the FSAI claimed identification of the source as a contaminated ingredient which had been added to pork feed, and said it was now considered that the profile of dioxins located is similar to those found in electronic transformer oils. On the evening of that same day, RTÉ, the state-run broadcaster, reported that the source of the crisis was a processing plant in County Carlow (see #Millstream Power Recycling Limited). A garda investigation was launched. The Association of Pigmeat Processors refused to continue slaughtering pigs, insisting they needed a massive financial package (up to €1 billion) from the Irish government to assist them with the mass recall. The European Union maintained that there would be no funding for the Irish pork industry in the wake of the crisis. Fine Gael leader Enda Kenny criticised the Irish government, calling the crisis "an unmitigated disaster".

=== Affected products ===
Most pork products are at risk of contamination; however, pork gelatine, products containing pork gelatine such as sweets, crisps and snack foods and sauces with pork or ham content are not.

=== Health effects of dioxins and PCBs ===

General chemical structure of PCBs (top) and dioxins (bottom)

1 part per trillion is approximately equivalent to dispersing one-twentieth of a drop of water throughout this 50-metre Olympic sized swimming pool.

Dioxins and polychlorinated biphenyls (PCBs) are two groups of predominately man-made toxic chemicals which, when consumed, affect both the immune and reproductive systems and are classified as probably carcinogenic by the World Health Organization and in the United States by the National Cancer Institute and the Agency for Toxic Substances and Disease Registry. The toxicity of dioxins and dioxin like PCBs is mediated by their ability to bind strongly to the aryl hydrocarbon cell receptor that is present in most animals.

Several epidemiological studies have observed a correlation between high levels of dioxins and PCBs in humans and a wide variety of adverse health effects e.g. chloracne, lowering of IQ, dysfunction of the thyroid gland and reduction of thyroid hormone levels, elevated rates of endometriosis in women, higher levels of diabetes in women, precocious puberty in females and subtle developmental delay in children, as evidenced by altered play activity. Males appear to be more sensitive to poisoning by high levels of dioxins & dioxin-like PCBs and are more likely to develop severe symptoms e.g. young men poisoned by TCDD (the most toxic dioxin) are less likely to father boys. See Geusau et al. (2001) who describe the clinical manifestations of two extremely severe (and probably criminal) dioxin poisoning cases.

Much of the hazard posed by dioxins and PCBs comes from their environmental persistence and their lipophilic nature, resulting their propensity to accumulate in the food chain, particularity in the fat of animals. About 80% of human exposure to dioxins and PCBs comes from animal derived foods e.g. poultry, beef and dairy. However, the health effects and risks of long-term, low-level exposure to the general public cannot be observed directly, and are highly controversial. It is not known if the dose response relationship at low-levels of exposure is sub-linear or linear, or has a threshold i.e. harmless at very low levels. Risk assessments are further complicated by the observation that contamination typically involves a complex mixture of related chemicals, the toxicity of each varies and has to be factored according to its Toxic Equivalency Factor (TEF) (where TCDD = 1). The product of TEF is the Toxic Equivalent Quantity (TEQ), and it is this value that is used in risk assessments (an on-line Toxic Equivalency Quantity Calculator).

The European Union (EU) uses a linear dose response curve at low-levels of exposure, below the point where there are epidemiological data. In other words, the EU assumes there is no safe level of dioxins and PCBs. Accordingly, the European Union sets extremely stringent limits for dioxin and dioxin like PCBs in food, set just above the usual background levels found in various food categories e.g. fish, poultry, beef, pork etc. The limit set for dioxins in pork fat and meat is 1 pg/g TEQ i.e. 1 parts per trillion (ppt) (see swimming pool illustration). The maximum dioxin contamination measured in Irish pork was 0.2 ng/g TEQ fat (200 ppt), equivalent to dispersing 10 drops of TCDD throughout a 2.5 million litre Olympic sized swimming pool.

=== Millstream Power Recycling Limited ===
52.6357°N 6.6228°W
RTÉ News has named the company behind the contaminated animal feed as Millstream Power Recycling Limited, "located just outside Fenagh, Co Carlow" (though the company's website says it is located in Clohamon Mills, Bunclody, Co. Wexford, 17 km away). All production at the plant was stopped in the week before the announcement, when a link between it and the contaminated feed was first suspected. A representative of the firm, David Curtin, denied reports of a use of industrial oil in the contaminated pig feed, saying that, whilst oil is used to power the machinery used for processing, he is not certain that this is the source of the outbreak. The oil, at the firm's insistence, was only ever purchased from "legitimate suppliers" within the Republic of Ireland. The owner of Millstream Power Recycling Limited was named as 43-year-old man Robert Hogg, who their website explains is their founder, and who got permission to "erect an agricultural feed store" in Clohamon, Bunclody in early 2004.

=== The Irish pork industry ===
The pork industry is the fourth biggest in Ireland's agriculture sector, worth around €400 million per year to the Irish economy. The country's farms produce over 3 million pigs per annum, almost 50% of which are consumed within the Republic. The remainder is exported, heavily to the neighbouring territories of Northern Ireland and Britain, but it also features in grocery stores and processed meats throughout two continents – Europe and Asia. In 2007, Ireland exported 113,000 tons of pig meat, nearly half of which went to the United Kingdom. Over 500,000 live pigs were also shipped to the UK for slaughter and processing in that country. Ireland's other major customers of its pork are Germany, the buyer of 9,000 tons in 2007; France, Italy and several countries within the boundaries of Eastern Europe, which together purchased over 20,000 tons, Russia, the buyer of 6,600 tons, and China, which came into the ownership of 1,100 tons.

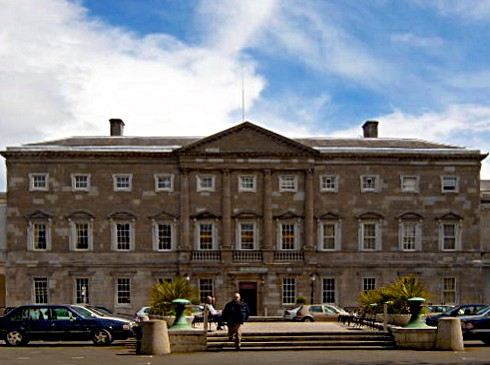
A lunchtime protest by dislocated workers was to take place on 11 December outside Leinster House (above).

=== Effects ===
Within two days of the first announcement 1,800 jobs had been lost in the Irish pig industry with a further 6,000 jobs said to be at risk by Ireland's largest trade union SIPTU. Ireland's largest pig meat processor, Rosderra Irish Meats Group Ltd., turned away all of its 850 employees at four plants on 8 December, telling them to sign up for state unemployment benefits. Workers in the pork industry who were laid off in the wake of the crisis, including those from affected plants in Edenderry, Waterford and Kilkenny, carried out a lunchtime protest at Leinster House (government buildings in Dublin) on 11 December. SIPTU organised the demonstration citing "delays in resuming production" and the financial "dire straits" some workers were in as their reasons. Processors halted the slaughtering of pigs until the Irish government promised them financial reparation. c.100,000 pigs were slaughtered and the estimated costs of the crisis was €100 million.

=== Reactions ===
==== Local reactions ====
Within hours a number of local newspapers in Ireland including the Longford Leader and the Leitrim Observer had reproduced copies of the same Press Association article.

==== National reactions ====
The Food Safety Authority of Ireland moved immediately to reassure the general public of Ireland. Speaking on RTÉ Radio on the morning after the initial announcement, Deputy chief executive of the FSAI, Alan Reilly said it was "necessary as a precautionary measure" to remove all pork products from within the country. He said he "expected" pork products to be available again before the busy Christmas period got underway and is scheduled to meet government officials and retailers within hours. Irish hotels and guesthouses were immediately notified of the unfolding situation and asked to dispose of all their pork products by the Irish Hotels Federation. Some Tesco outlets initially only gave refunds for their own branded pork produce but have since begun issuing refunds to all affected Irish products. Superquinn however gave full refunds. A helpline set up by the Food Safety Authority of Ireland had received 3,000 calls within 72 hours of the outbreak.

The animal feed industry worked with academics, led by Chris Elliott at Queen's University Belfast to assess the future risk of a recurrence, other possible contaminants in animal feed and to develop testing and monitoring systems to significantly reduce the possibility of another incident. This led to a systematic sampling and testing programme at animal feed mills that by 2022 was assessing over 6 million tonnes of animal feed annually.

==== International reactions ====
The UK's Food Standards Agency has said it does not believe its country's consumers face "significant risk" but it was still awaiting confirmation from the Irish authorities that the affected products had not been exported to its neighbour. Chief Scientist Andrew Wadge stated on his FSA blog that because dioxins remain in the body for approximately 30 years, exceeding regulatory limits for a few days has an "insignificant" effect on the individual consumer. The Tolerable Daily Intake standard sets a level that is without appreciable risk to health over a prolonged period.

In Asia, South Korea has banned imports and advised retailers to stop selling Irish produce, Singapore was following suit, whilst China has "provisionally" stopped importation. Japan has also said it may recall Irish pork products.

===== Press =====
Within twelve hours of the pork recall announcement, the international press was carrying the story and within thirty-six hours there were over 1,700 newspaper articles on the crisis globally. Tabloid The Sun announced the story as "Toxic Irish pork is swept off shelves" whilst the Daily Mirror opted for "Poison pork panic: Irish pigs were fed on plastic bags". Daily Express ran the story under the banner headline "Shoppers told: Don't eat toxic Irish pork" and the Daily Mail went with the headline "British shoppers 'may not be able to tell whether they have Irish poison pork in their fridge'". The Times had the headline "Shops rush to take Irish pork off shelves", warning that EU labelling laws meant pork originating in Ireland could have been labelled as British. Le Monde had the top-five most e-mailed website headline "Dioxin alert in Irish pork" and The Straits Times website had the crisis as its second most popular story. El País reported its concern that contaminated meat might have arrived in Spain via France and Portugal. The New York Times, under the headline "Ireland investigating tainted pork" and The Washington Post, under the headline "Ireland recalls pork products after dioxin test", covered the story in their own short ways. AFP had the headline "Ireland scrambles to contain pork cancer scare" and the Xinhua News Agency was one of the earliest news agencies to follow the story with headlines including "Irish police to investigate pork contamination". CNN tagged the story as "another red flag being waved over dinner tables this week with warnings from the Irish government not to eat its pork products", comparing the crisis to bovine spongiform encephalopathy, bird flu and the 2008 Chinese milk scandal.

An Irish supermarket six days following the outbreak of the crisis, only offering Danish pork for sale.

=== Return to shelves ===
Superquinn has said it would have Irish pork, traceable to one farm in County Kilkenny on shelves by 11 December, becoming the first Irish supermarket chain to do so.

== Other affected foods ==
=== Beef ===
Twenty one cattle farms in the Republic were discovered to have used the contaminated pig feed, whilst eight cattle farms used it in Northern Ireland. It was disclosed on 18 December 2008 that beef samples from the affected farms had dioxin levels between 100 and 400 times above the legal limit. The Irish authorities went to great lengths to insist that the threat to public health from Irish beef products, despite the extremely high dioxin levels, was insignificant. It was noted that the official announcement made no reference to the dioxin levels being 100 to 400 times the legal limit. In a statement the FSAI recommended "that cattle which are locked down from these 21 farms should now be slaughtered and not allowed enter the food chain". There was to be no public recall of Irish beef. The European Commission was being kept informed.

However, 3,000 animals from these herds have been slaughtered and have already entered the food chain since September. The UK's Food Standards Agency was conducting tests to assess the level of dioxins present in Northern Irish cattle herds.

=== Milk ===
One farm in Northern Ireland has been identified as having fed contaminated animal feed to dairy cattle. Northern Ireland's Minister of Health, Social Services and Public Safety, Michael McGimpsey has announced restrictions on milk supplies in the province.

== European Food Safety Authority's statement ==
In its statement issued on 10 December 2008, The European Food Safety Authority (EFSA) considered that the levels of dioxin & dioxin like PCBs in Irish pork, before the contaminated pork was withdrawn, posed no risk to health. The EFSA calculated a number of different exposure scenarios, and they found that if a consumer ate Irish pork each day over the 90-day period, 10% of which was contaminated, the "increase in the body burden [would be] of no concern for this single event". In the "very extreme case" of eating large amounts of 100% contaminated Irish pork every day over the 90-day period in question, the EFSA considered that "this unlikely scenario would reduce protection, but not necessarily lead to adverse health effects".

However the EFSA warns that its calculations are "Based on the very limited new data related to the current contamination incident of pork, which were made available to EFSA" and concludes its statement with the "EFSA based this statement on a limited data set". It also makes clear that its calculations assumed that exposure at these high levels only began in September 2008. If it would be found that the animal feed had been contaminated prior to September 2008 then it would have to re-evaluate its findings. The statement did not address the issue of contaminated beef.

== Criminal investigation ==
A criminal investigation commenced in December 2008 and on 6 March 2010 it was reported in the Irish Times that a criminal prosecution would be taken in relation to the incident.

== Civil case ==
Millstream Recycling Ltd. has taken a civil case against Gerard Tierney of Blackrock, and against his company Newtown Lodge Ltd. Millstream claims its pig feed products were contaminated by "defective" oil supplied by Mr. Tierney and his company.

== Past contamination incidents ==
See also Polychlorinated dibenzodioxins

== See also ==
- 2013 horse meat scandal
- List of food contamination incidents
- Pork in Ireland
