= TCDD =

TCDD may refer to:

- Turkish State Railways (Türkiye Cumhuriyeti Devlet Demiryolları), the national railway carrier of Turkey
  - TCDD Taşımacılık, a Turkish transport company responsible for railway operations
- 2,3,7,8-Tetrachlorodibenzodioxin, a type of dioxin
