= Polychlorinated dibenzodioxins =

Class of environmentally polluting organic compounds

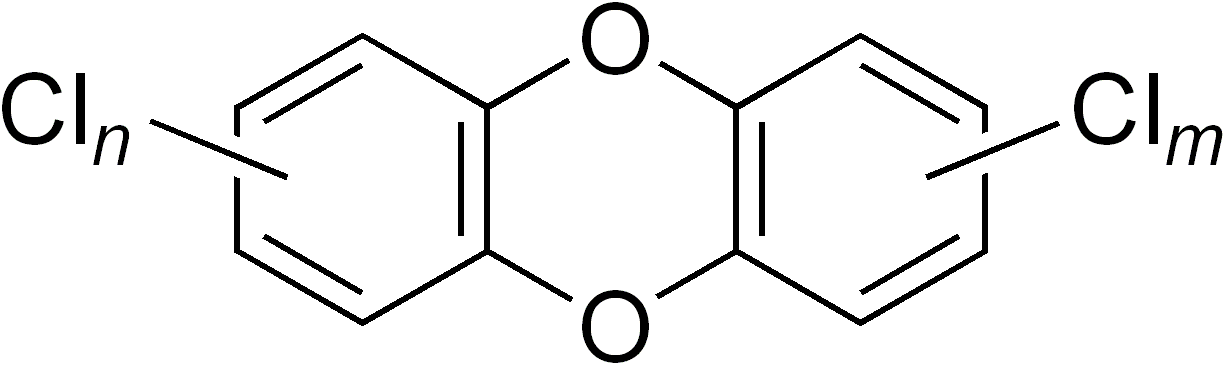
General structure of PCDDs where n and m can range from 0 to 4

Polychlorinated dibenzodioxins (PCDDs), or simply dioxins, are a group of long-lived polyhalogenated organic compounds that are primarily anthropogenic, and contribute toxic, persistent organic pollution in the environment.

They are commonly referred to as dioxins for simplicity, because every PCDD molecule contains a dibenzo-1,4-dioxin skeletal structure, with 1,4-dioxin as the central ring. Members of the PCDD family bioaccumulate in humans and wildlife because of their lipophilic properties, and may cause developmental disturbances and cancer.

Because dioxins can persist in the environment for more than 100 years, the majority of PCDD pollution today is not the result of recent emissions, but the cumulative result of synthetic processes undertaken since the beginning of the 20th century, including organochloride-related manufacturing, incineration of chlorine-containing substances such as polyvinyl chloride (PVC), and chlorine bleaching of paper. Forest fires and volcanic eruptions have also been cited as an airborne source, although their contribution to the current levels of PCDD accumulation are minor in comparison. Incidents of dioxin poisoning resulting from industrial emissions and accidents were first recorded as early as the mid 19th century during the Industrial Revolution.

The word "dioxins" may also refer to other similarly acting chlorinated compounds (see Dioxins and dioxin-like compounds).

== Chemical structure of dibenzo-1,4-dioxins ==
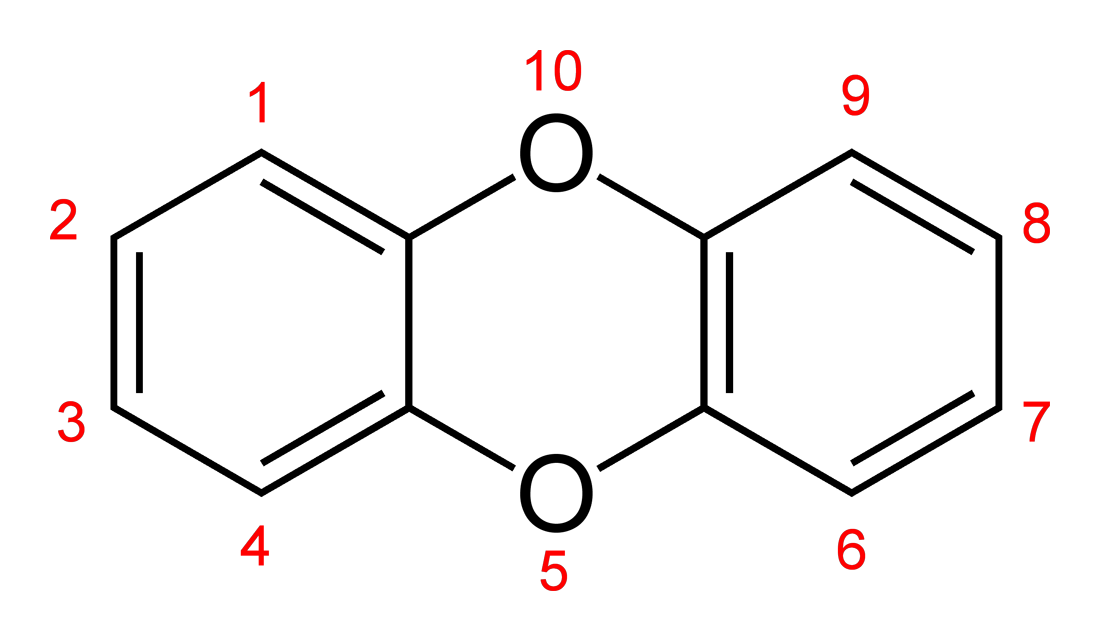
The skeletal formula and substituent numbering scheme of the parent compound dibenzo-1,4-dioxin

The structure of dibenzo-1,4-dioxin consists of two benzene rings joined by two oxygen bridges. This makes the compound an aromatic diether. The name dioxin formally refers to the central dioxygenated ring, which is stabilized by the two flanking benzene rings.

In PCDDs, chlorine atoms are attached to this structure at any of eight different places on the molecule, at positions 1–4 and 6–9. There are 75 different PCDD congeners (that is, related dioxin compounds).

number	formula	name	CAS Number	InChIKey
PCDD-1	C_{12}H_{7}ClO_{2}	1-chlorodibenzo-p-dioxin	39227-53-7	VGGGRWRBGXENKI-UHFFFAOYSA-N
PCDD-2	C_{12}H_{7}ClO_{2}	2-chlorodibenzo-p-dioxin	39227-54-8	GIUGGRUEPHPVNR-UHFFFAOYSA-N
PCDD-12	C_{12}H_{6}Cl_{2}O_{2}	1,2-dichlorodibenzo-p-dioxin	54536-18-4	DFGDMWHUCCHXIF-UHFFFAOYSA-N
PCDD-13	C_{12}H_{6}Cl_{2}O_{2}	1,3-dichlorodibenzo-p-dioxin	50585-39-2	AZYJYMAKTBXNSX-UHFFFAOYSA-N
PCDD-14	C_{12}H_{6}Cl_{2}O_{2}	1,4-dichlorodibenzo-p-dioxin	54536-19-5	MBMUPQZSDWVPQU-UHFFFAOYSA-N
PCDD-16	C_{12}H_{6}Cl_{2}O_{2}	1,6-dichlorodibenzo-p-dioxin	38178-38-0	MAWMBEVNJGEDAD-UHFFFAOYSA-N
PCDD-17	C_{12}H_{6}Cl_{2}O_{2}	1,7-dichlorodibenzo-p-dioxin	82291-26-7	IJUWLAFPPVRYGY-UHFFFAOYSA-N
PCDD-18	C_{12}H_{6}Cl_{2}O_{2}	1,8-dichlorodibenzo-p-dioxin	82291-27-8	PLZYIHQBHROTFD-UHFFFAOYSA-N
PCDD-19	C_{12}H_{6}Cl_{2}O_{2}	1,9-dichlorodibenzo-p-dioxin	82291-28-9	JZDVJXBKJDADAY-UHFFFAOYSA-N
PCDD-23	C_{12}H_{6}Cl_{2}O_{2}	2,3-dichlorodibenzo-p-dioxin	29446-15-9	YCIYTXRUZSDMRZ-UHFFFAOYSA-N
PCDD-27	C_{12}H_{6}Cl_{2}O_{2}	2,7-dichlorodibenzo-p-dioxin	33857-26-0	NBFMTHWVRBOVPE-UHFFFAOYSA-N
PCDD-28	C_{12}H_{6}Cl_{2}O_{2}	2,8-dichlorodibenzo-p-dioxin	38964-22-6	WMWJCKBJUQDYLM-UHFFFAOYSA-N
PCDD-123	C_{12}H_{5}Cl_{3}O_{2}	1,2,3-trichlorodibenzo-p-dioxin	54536-17-3	SKMFBGZVVNDVFR-UHFFFAOYSA-N
PCDD-124	C_{12}H_{5}Cl_{3}O_{2}	1,2,4-trichlorodibenzo-p-dioxin	39227-58-2	HRVUKLBFRPWXPJ-UHFFFAOYSA-N
PCDD-126	C_{12}H_{5}Cl_{3}O_{2}	1,2,6-trichlorodibenzo-p-dioxin	69760-96-9	XQBPVWBIUBCJJO-UHFFFAOYSA-N
PCDD-127	C_{12}H_{5}Cl_{3}O_{2}	1,2,7-trichlorodibenzo-p-dioxin	82291-30-3	TXJMXDWFPQSYEQ-UHFFFAOYSA-N
PCDD-128	C_{12}H_{5}Cl_{3}O_{2}	1,2,8-trichlorodibenzo-p-dioxin	82291-31-4	QBEOCKSANJLBAE-UHFFFAOYSA-N
PCDD-129	C_{12}H_{5}Cl_{3}O_{2}	1,2,9-trichlorodibenzo-p-dioxin	82291-32-5	DQLRDBDQLSIOIX-UHFFFAOYSA-N
PCDD-136	C_{12}H_{5}Cl_{3}O_{2}	1,3,6-trichlorodibenzo-p-dioxin	82291-33-6	LNPVMVSAUXUGHH-UHFFFAOYSA-N
PCDD-137	C_{12}H_{5}Cl_{3}O_{2}	1,3,7-trichlorodibenzo-p-dioxin	67028-17-5	RPKWIXFZKMDPMH-UHFFFAOYSA-N
PCDD-138	C_{12}H_{5}Cl_{3}O_{2}	1,3,8-trichlorodibenzo-p-dioxin	82306-61-4	FJAKCOBYQSEWMT-UHFFFAOYSA-N
PCDD-139	C_{12}H_{5}Cl_{3}O_{2}	1,3,9-trichlorodibenzo-p-dioxin	82306-62-5	DGDADRUTFAIIQQ-UHFFFAOYSA-N
PCDD-146	C_{12}H_{5}Cl_{3}O_{2}	1,4,6-trichlorodibenzo-p-dioxin	82306-63-6	UTTYFTWIJLRXKB-UHFFFAOYSA-N
PCDD-147	C_{12}H_{5}Cl_{3}O_{2}	1,4,7-trichlorodibenzo-p-dioxin	82306-64-7	NBWAQBGJBSYXHV-UHFFFAOYSA-N
PCDD-178	C_{12}H_{5}Cl_{3}O_{2}	1,7,8-trichlorodibenzo-p-dioxin	82306-65-8	CAPCTZJHYADFNX-UHFFFAOYSA-N
PCDD-237	C_{12}H_{5}Cl_{3}O_{2}	2,3,7-trichlorodibenzo-p-dioxin	33857-28-2	ZSIZNEVHVVRPFF-UHFFFAOYSA-N
PCDD-1234	C_{12}H_{4}Cl_{4}O_{2}	1,2,3,4-tetrachlorodibenzo-p-dioxin	30746-58-8	DJHHDLMTUOLVHY-UHFFFAOYSA-N
PCDD-1236	C_{12}H_{4}Cl_{4}O_{2}	1,2,3,6-tetrachlorodibenzo-p-dioxin	71669-25-5	XEZBZSVTUSXISZ-UHFFFAOYSA-N
PCDD-1237	C_{12}H_{4}Cl_{4}O_{2}	1,2,3,7-tetrachlorodibenzo-p-dioxin	67028-18-6	SKGXYFVQZVPEFP-UHFFFAOYSA-N
PCDD-1238	C_{12}H_{4}Cl_{4}O_{2}	1,2,3,8-tetrachlorodibenzo-p-dioxin	53555-02-5	BXKLTNKYLCZOHF-UHFFFAOYSA-N
PCDD-1239	C_{12}H_{4}Cl_{4}O_{2}	1,2,3,9-tetrachlorodibenzo-p-dioxin	71669-26-6	CMVHZKSHSHQJHS-UHFFFAOYSA-N
PCDD-1246	C_{12}H_{4}Cl_{4}O_{2}	1,2,4,6-tetrachlorodibenzo-p-dioxin	71669-27-7	KQNBZUDHTCXCNA-UHFFFAOYSA-N
PCDD-1247	C_{12}H_{4}Cl_{4}O_{2}	1,2,4,7-tetrachlorodibenzo-p-dioxin	71669-28-8	SMPHQCMJQUBTFZ-UHFFFAOYSA-N
PCDD-1248	C_{12}H_{4}Cl_{4}O_{2}	1,2,4,8-tetrachlorodibenzo-p-dioxin	71669-29-9	XGIKODBWQSAEFQ-UHFFFAOYSA-N
PCDD-1249	C_{12}H_{4}Cl_{4}O_{2}	1,2,4,9-tetrachlorodibenzo-p-dioxin	71665-99-1	WDAHVJCSSYOALR-UHFFFAOYSA-N
PCDD-1267	C_{12}H_{4}Cl_{4}O_{2}	1,2,6,7-tetrachlorodibenzo-p-dioxin	40581-90-6	SAMLAWFHXZIRMP-UHFFFAOYSA-N
PCDD-1268	C_{12}H_{4}Cl_{4}O_{2}	1,2,6,8-tetrachlorodibenzo-p-dioxin	67323-56-2	YYUFYZDSYHKVDP-UHFFFAOYSA-N
PCDD-1269	C_{12}H_{4}Cl_{4}O_{2}	1,2,6,9-tetrachlorodibenzo-p-dioxin	40581-91-7	ZKMXKYXNLFLUCD-UHFFFAOYSA-N
PCDD-1278	C_{12}H_{4}Cl_{4}O_{2}	1,2,7,8-tetrachlorodibenzo-p-dioxin	34816-53-0	YDZCLBKUTXYYKS-UHFFFAOYSA-N
PCDD-1279	C_{12}H_{4}Cl_{4}O_{2}	1,2,7,9-tetrachlorodibenzo-p-dioxin	71669-23-3	QIKHBBZEUNSCAF-UHFFFAOYSA-N
PCDD-1289	C_{12}H_{4}Cl_{4}O_{2}	1,2,8,9-tetrachlorodibenzo-p-dioxin	62470-54-6	WELWFAGPAZKSBG-UHFFFAOYSA-N
PCDD-1368	C_{12}H_{4}Cl_{4}O_{2}	1,3,6,8-tetrachlorodibenzo-p-dioxin	33423-92-6	OTQFXRBLGNEOGH-UHFFFAOYSA-N
PCDD-1369	C_{12}H_{4}Cl_{4}O_{2}	1,3,6,9-tetrachlorodibenzo-p-dioxin	71669-24-4	QAUIRDIJIUMMEP-UHFFFAOYSA-N
PCDD-1378	C_{12}H_{4}Cl_{4}O_{2}	1,3,7,8-tetrachlorodibenzo-p-dioxin	50585-46-1	VPTDIAYLYJBYQG-UHFFFAOYSA-N
PCDD-1379	C_{12}H_{4}Cl_{4}O_{2}	1,3,7,9-tetrachlorodibenzo-p-dioxin	62470-53-5	JMGYHLJVDHUACM-UHFFFAOYSA-N
PCDD-1469	C_{12}H_{4}Cl_{4}O_{2}	1,4,6,9-tetrachlorodibenzo-p-dioxin	40581-93-9	QTIIAIRUSSSOHT-UHFFFAOYSA-N
PCDD-1478	C_{12}H_{4}Cl_{4}O_{2}	1,4,7,8-tetrachlorodibenzo-p-dioxin	40581-94-0	FCRXUTCUWCJZJI-UHFFFAOYSA-N
PCDD-2378 (TCDD)	C_{12}H_{4}Cl_{4}O_{2}	2,3,7,8-tetrachlorodibenzo-p-dioxin	1746-01-6	HGUFODBRKLSHSI-UHFFFAOYSA-N
PCDD-12346	C_{12}H_{3}Cl_{5}O_{2}	1,2,3,4,6-pentachlorodibenzo-p-dioxin	67028-19-7	LNWDBNKKBLRAMH-UHFFFAOYSA-N
PCDD-12347	C_{12}H_{3}Cl_{5}O_{2}	1,2,3,4,7-pentachlorodibenzo-p-dioxin	39227-61-7	WRNGAZFESPEMCN-UHFFFAOYSA-N
PCDD-12367	C_{12}H_{3}Cl_{5}O_{2}	1,2,3,6,7-pentachlorodibenzo-p-dioxin	71925-15-0	RLGWDUHOIIWPGN-UHFFFAOYSA-N
PCDD-12368	C_{12}H_{3}Cl_{5}O_{2}	1,2,3,6,8-pentachlorodibenzo-p-dioxin	71925-16-1	VKDGHBBUEIIEHL-UHFFFAOYSA-N
PCDD-12369 (PCDD-14678)	C_{12}H_{3}Cl_{5}O_{2}	1,2,3,6,9-pentachlorodibenzo-p-dioxin	82291-34-7	NWKWRHSKKNELND-UHFFFAOYSA-N
PCDD-12378	C_{12}H_{3}Cl_{5}O_{2}	1,2,3,7,8-pentachlorodibenzo-p-dioxin	40321-76-4	FSPZPQQWDODWAU-UHFFFAOYSA-N
PCDD-12379 (PCDD-23468)	C_{12}H_{3}Cl_{5}O_{2}	1,2,3,7,9-pentachlorodibenzo-p-dioxin	71925-17-2	UAOYHTXYVWEPIB-UHFFFAOYSA-N
PCDD-12389 (PCDD-23467)	C_{12}H_{3}Cl_{5}O_{2}	1,2,3,8,9-pentachlorodibenzo-p-dioxin	71925-18-3	VUMZAVNIADYKFC-UHFFFAOYSA-N
PCDD-12467	C_{12}H_{3}Cl_{5}O_{2}	1,2,4,6,7-pentachlorodibenzo-p-dioxin	82291-35-8	SEKDDGLKEYEVQK-UHFFFAOYSA-N
PCDD-12468	C_{12}H_{3}Cl_{5}O_{2}	1,2,4,6,8-pentachlorodibenzo-p-dioxin	71998-76-0	SJJWALZHAWITMS-UHFFFAOYSA-N
PCDD-12469	C_{12}H_{3}Cl_{5}O_{2}	1,2,4,6,9-pentachlorodibenzo-p-dioxin	82291-36-9	GNQVSAMSAKZLKE-UHFFFAOYSA-N
PCDD-12478	C_{12}H_{3}Cl_{5}O_{2}	1,2,4,7,8-pentachlorodibenzo-p-dioxin	58802-08-7	QUPLGUUISJOUPJ-UHFFFAOYSA-N
PCDD-12479 (PCDD-13468)	C_{12}H_{3}Cl_{5}O_{2}	1,2,4,7,9-pentachlorodibenzo-p-dioxin	82291-37-0	QLBBXWPVEFJZEC-UHFFFAOYSA-N
PCDD-12489 (PCDD-13467)	C_{12}H_{3}Cl_{5}O_{2}	1,2,4,8,9-pentachlorodibenzo-p-dioxin	82291-38-1	KLLFLRKEOJCTGC-UHFFFAOYSA-N
PCDD-123467	C_{12}H_{2}Cl_{6}O_{2}	1,2,3,4,6,7-hexachlorodibenzo-p-dioxin	58200-66-1	NLBQVWJHLWAFGJ-UHFFFAOYSA-N
PCDD-123468	C_{12}H_{2}Cl_{6}O_{2}	1,2,3,4,6,8-hexachlorodibenzo-p-dioxin	58200-67-2	IMALTUQZEIFHJW-UHFFFAOYSA-N
PCDD-123469	C_{12}H_{2}Cl_{6}O_{2}	1,2,3,4,6,9-hexachlorodibenzo-p-dioxin	58200-68-3	UDYXCMRDCOVQLG-UHFFFAOYSA-N
PCDD-123478	C_{12}H_{2}Cl_{6}O_{2}	1,2,3,4,7,8-hexachlorodibenzo-p-dioxin	39227-28-6	WCYYQNSQJHPVMG-UHFFFAOYSA-N
PCDD-123678	C_{12}H_{2}Cl_{6}O_{2}	1,2,3,6,7,8-hexachlorodibenzo-p-dioxin	57653-85-7	YCLUIPQDHHPDJJ-UHFFFAOYSA-N
PCDD-123679 (PCDD-124678)	C_{12}H_{2}Cl_{6}O_{2}	1,2,3,6,7,9-hexachlorodibenzo-p-dioxin	64461-98-9	BQOHWGKNRKCEFT-UHFFFAOYSA-N
PCDD-123689 (PCDD-134678)	C_{12}H_{2}Cl_{6}O_{2}	1,2,3,6,8,9-hexachlorodibenzo-p-dioxin	58200-69-4	GZRQZUFXVFRKBI-UHFFFAOYSA-N
PCDD-123789 (PCDD-234678)	C_{12}H_{2}Cl_{6}O_{2}	1,2,3,7,8,9-hexachlorodibenzo-p-dioxin	19408-74-3	LGIRBUBHIWTVCK-UHFFFAOYSA-N
PCDD-124679	C_{12}H_{2}Cl_{6}O_{2}	1,2,4,6,7,9-hexachlorodibenzo-p-dioxin	39227-62-8	BSJDQMWAWFTDGD-UHFFFAOYSA-N
PCDD-124689 (PCDD-134679)	C_{12}H_{2}Cl_{6}O_{2}	1,2,4,6,8,9-hexachlorodibenzo-p-dioxin	58802-09-8	URELDHWUZUWPIU-UHFFFAOYSA-N
PCDD-1234678	C_{12}HCl_{7}O_{2}	1,2,3,4,6,7,8-heptachlorodibenzo-p-dioxin	35822-46-9	WCLNVRQZUKYVAI-UHFFFAOYSA-N
PCDD-1234679	C_{12}HCl_{7}O_{2}	1,2,3,4,6,7,9-heptachlorodibenzo-p-dioxin	58200-70-7	KTJJIBIRZGQFQZ-UHFFFAOYSA-N
PCDD-12346789	C_{12}Cl_{8}O_{2}	octachlorodibenzo-p-dioxin	3268-87-9	FOIBFBMSLDGNHL-UHFFFAOYSA-N

The toxicity of PCDDs depends on the number and positions of the chlorine atoms. The World Health Organization toxic equivalent (WHO-TEQ) scheme considers the seven congeners containing chlorines in 2,3,7,8-positions to display TCDD-like toxicity, with the 2022 scheme assigning them Toxic Equivalency Factors ranging from 1 (for TCDD) to 0.001 (for OCDD).

== Historical perspective ==
Structure of 2,3,7,8-tetrachlorodibenzodioxin (TCDD)

Low concentrations of dioxins existed in nature prior to industrialization as a result of natural combustion and geological processes. Dioxins were first unintentionally produced as by-products from 1848 onwards as Leblanc process plants started operating in Germany. The first intentional synthesis of chlorinated dibenzodioxin was in 1872. Today, concentrations of dioxins are found in all humans, with higher levels commonly found in persons living in more industrialized countries. The most toxic dioxin, 2,3,7,8-tetrachlorodibenzodioxin (TCDD), became well known as a contaminant of Agent Orange, a herbicide used in the Malayan Emergency and the Vietnam War. Later, dioxins were found in Times Beach, Missouri and Love Canal, New York and Seveso, Italy. More recently, dioxins have been in the news with the poisoning of President Viktor Yushchenko of Ukraine in 2004, the Naples Mozzarella Crisis, the 2008 Irish pork crisis, and the German feed incident of 2010.

== Sources of dioxins ==
The United States Environmental Protection Agency inventory of sources of dioxin-like compounds is possibly the most comprehensive review of the sources and releases of dioxins, but other countries now have substantial research as well.

Concentration profile of PCDD in a dated sediment core from Esthwaite Water, Cumbria, UK

Occupational exposure is an issue for some in the chemical industries, historically for those making chlorophenols or chlorophenoxy acid herbicides or in the application of chemicals, notably herbicides. In many developed nations there are now emissions regulations which have dramatically decreased the emissions and thus alleviated some concerns, although the lack of continuous sampling of dioxin emissions causes concern about the understatement of emissions. In Belgium, through the introduction of a process called AMESA, continuous sampling showed that periodic sampling understated emissions by a factor of 30 to 50 times. Few facilities have continuous sampling.

Dioxins are produced in small concentrations when organic material is burned in the presence of chlorine, whether the chlorine is present as chloride ions or as organochlorine compounds, so they are widely produced in many contexts. According to the most recent US EPA data, the major sources of dioxins are broadly in the following types:

- Combustion sources, e.g. municipal waste or medical waste incinerators and private backyard barrel burning
- Metal smelting
- Refining and process sources
- Chemical manufacturing sources
- Natural sources
- Environmental reservoirs

When first carried out in 1987, the original US EPA inventory of dioxin sources revealed that incineration represented more than 80% of known dioxin sources. As a result, US EPA implemented new emissions requirements. These regulations succeeded in reducing dioxin stack emissions from incinerators. Incineration of municipal solid waste, medical waste, sewage sludge, and hazardous waste together now produce less than 3% of all dioxin emissions. Since 1987, however, backyard barrel burning has showed almost no decrease, and is now the largest source of dioxin emissions, producing about one third of the total output.

In incineration, dioxins can also reform or form de novo in the atmosphere above the stack as the exhaust gases cool through a temperature window of 600 to 200 °C. The most common method of reducing the quantity of dioxins reforming or forming de novo is through rapid (30 millisecond) quenching of the exhaust gases through that 400 °C window. Incinerator emissions of dioxins have been reduced by over 90% as a result of new emissions control requirements. Incineration in developed countries is now a very minor contributor to dioxin emissions.

Dioxins are also generated in reactions that do not involve burning — such as chlorine bleaching fibers for paper or textiles, and in the manufacture of chlorinated phenols, particularly when reaction temperature is not well controlled. Compounds involved include the wood preservative pentachlorophenol, and also herbicides such as 2,4-dichlorophenoxyacetic acid (or 2,4-D) and 2,4,5-trichlorophenoxyacetic acid (2,4,5-T). Higher levels of chlorination require higher reaction temperatures and greater dioxin production. Dioxins may also be formed during the photochemical breakdown of the common antimicrobial compound triclosan.

== Sources of human intake ==
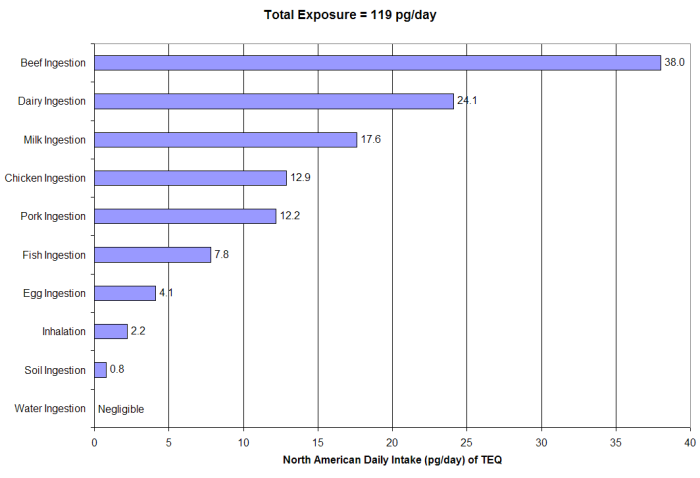
A chart illustrating how much dioxin the average American consumes per day. (Note: pg = picogram, or one trillionth of a gram, or 10^{−12} g).

Tolerable daily, monthly or annual intakes have been set by the World Health Organization and a number of governments. Dioxins enter the general population almost exclusively from ingestion of food, specifically through the consumption of fish, meat, and dairy products since dioxins are fat-soluble and readily climb the food chain.

Children are passed substantial body burdens by their mothers, and breastfeeding increases the child's body burden. Dioxin exposure can also occur from contact with Pentachlorophenol (Penta) treated lumber as Pentachlorophenol often contains dioxins as a contaminant. Children's daily intakes during breast feeding are often many times above the intakes of adults based on body weight. This is why the WHO consultation group assessed the tolerable intake so as to prevent a woman from accumulating harmful body burdens before her first pregnancy. Breast fed children usually still have higher dioxin body burdens than non breast fed children. The WHO still recommends breast feeding for its other benefits. In many countries dioxins in breast milk have decreased by even 90% during the two last decades.

Dioxins are present in cigarette smoke. Dioxin in cigarette smoke was noted as "understudied" by the US EPA in its "Re-Evaluating Dioxin" (1995). In that same document, the US EPA acknowledged that dioxin in cigarettes is "anthropogenic" (man-made, "not likely in nature").

== Metabolism ==
Dioxins are absorbed primarily through dietary intake of fat, as this is where they accumulate in animals and humans. In humans, the highly chlorinated dioxins are stored in fatty tissues and are neither readily metabolized nor excreted. The estimated elimination half-life for highly chlorinated dioxins (4–8 chlorine atoms) in humans ranges from 4.9 to 13.1 years.

The persistence of a particular dioxin congener in an animal is thought to be a consequence of its structure. Dioxins with no lateral (2, 3, 7, and 8) chlorines, which thus contain hydrogen atoms on adjacent pairs of carbons, can more readily be oxidized by cytochromes P450. The oxidized dioxins can then be more readily excreted rather than stored for a long time.

== Toxicity ==
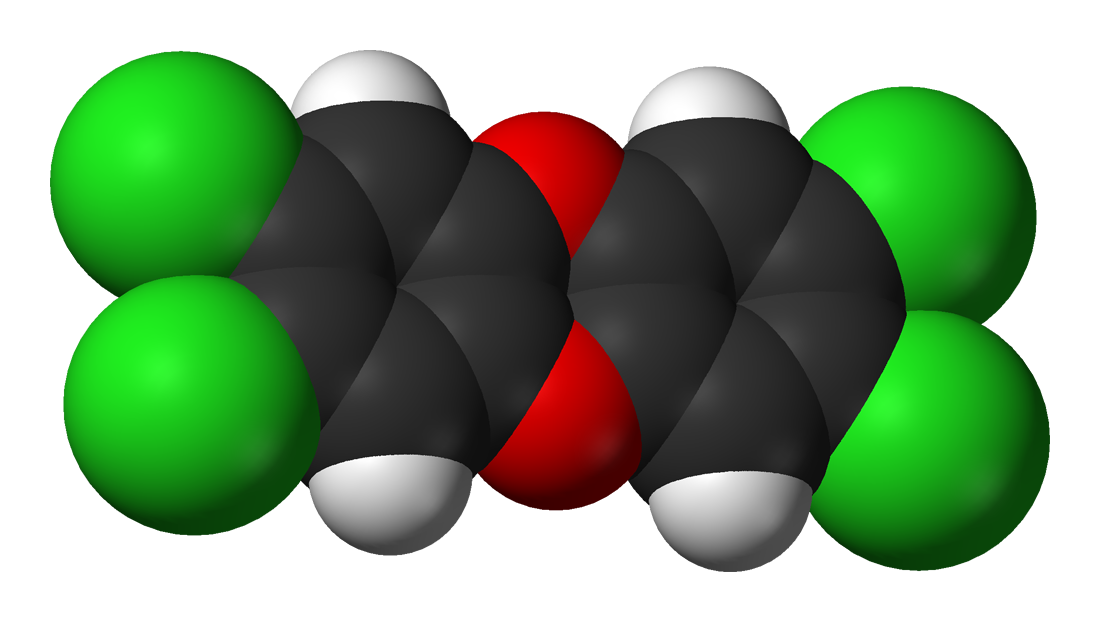
Space-filling model of 2,3,7,8-tetrachlorodibenzodioxin

2,3,7,8-Tetrachlorodibenzodioxin (TCDD) is considered the most toxic of the congeners (for the mechanism of action, see 2,3,7,8-Tetrachlorodibenzodioxin and Aryl hydrocarbon receptor). Other dioxin congeners including PCDFs and PCBs with dioxin-like toxicity, are given a toxicity rating from 0 to 1, where TCDD = 1 (see Dioxins and dioxin-like compounds). This toxicity rating is called the Toxic Equivalence Factor concept, or TEF. TEFs are consensus values and, because of the strong species dependence for toxicity, are listed separately for mammals, fish, and birds. TEFs for mammalian species are generally applicable to human risk calculations. The TEFs have been developed from detailed assessment of literature data to facilitate both risk assessment and regulatory control. Many other compounds may also have dioxin-like properties, particularly non-ortho PCBs, one of which has a TEF as high as 0.1.

The total dioxin toxic equivalence (TEQ) value expresses the toxicity as if the mixture were pure TCDD. The TEQ approach and current TEFs have been adopted internationally as the most appropriate way to estimate the potential health risks of mixture of dioxins. Recent data suggest that this type of simple scaling factor may not be the most appropriate treatment for complex mixtures of dioxins; both transfer from the source and absorption and elimination vary among different congeners, and the TEF value is not able to accurately reflect this.

Dioxins and other persistent organic pollutants (POPs) are subject to the Stockholm Convention. The treaty obliges signatories to take measures to eliminate where possible, and minimize where not possible to eliminate, all sources of dioxin.

== Health effects in humans ==
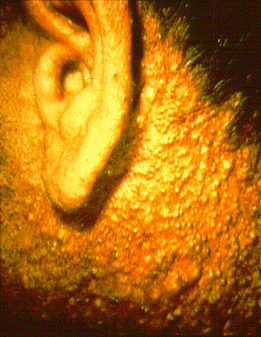
Chloracne on the ear and neck of a herbicide production worker

Dioxins build up primarily in fatty tissues over time (bioaccumulation), so even small exposures may eventually reach dangerous levels. In 1994, the US EPA reported that dioxins are a probable carcinogen, but noted that non-cancer effects (reproduction and sexual development, immune system) may pose a greater threat to human health. TCDD, the most toxic of the dibenzodioxins, is classified as a Group 1 carcinogen by the International Agency for Research on Cancer (IARC). TCDD has a half-life of approximately 8 years in humans, although at high concentrations, the elimination rate is enhanced by metabolism. The health effects of dioxins are mediated by their action on a cellular receptor, the aryl hydrocarbon receptor (AhR).

Exposure to high levels of dioxins in humans causes a severe form of persistent acne, known as chloracne. High occupational or accidental levels of exposures to dioxins have been shown by epidemiological studies to lead to an increased risk of tumors at all sites. Other effects in humans (at high dose levels) may include:

- Developmental abnormalities in the enamel of children's teeth.
- Central and peripheral nervous system pathology
- Thyroid disorders
- Damage to the immune systems
- Endometriosis
- Diabetes

Recent studies have shown that high exposure to dioxins changes the ratio of male to female births among a population such that more females are born than males.

Dioxins accumulate in food chains in a fashion similar to other chlorinated compounds (bioaccumulation). This means that even small concentrations in contaminated water can be concentrated up a food chain to dangerous levels because of the long biological half life and low water solubility of dioxins.

== Toxic effects in animals ==
While it has been difficult to establish specific health effects in humans due to the lack of controlled dose experiments, studies in animals have shown that dioxin causes a wide variety of toxic effects. In particular, TCDD has been shown to be teratogenic, mutagenic, carcinogenic, immunotoxic, and hepatotoxic. Furthermore, alterations in multiple endocrine and growth factor systems have been reported. The most sensitive effects, observed in multiple species, appear to be developmental, including effects on the developing immune, nervous, and reproductive systems. The most sensitive effects are caused at body burdens relatively close to those reported in humans.

Among the animals for which TCDD toxicity has been studied, there is strong evidence for the following effects:

- Birth defects (teratogenicity)

In rodents, including rats, mice, hamsters and guinea pigs, birds, and fish.

- Cancer (including neoplasms in the mammalian lung, oral/nasal cavities, thyroid and adrenal glands, and liver, squamous cell carcinoma, and various animal hepatocarcinomas)

In rodents and fish.

- Hepatotoxicity (liver toxicity)

In rodents, chickens, and fish.

- Endocrine disruption

In rodents and fish.

- Immunosuppression

In rodents and fish.

The LD50 of dioxin also varies wildly between species with the most notable disparity being between the ostensibly similar species of hamster and guinea pig. The oral LD50 for guinea pigs is as low as 0.5 to 2 μg/kg body weight, whereas the oral LD50 for hamsters can be as high as 1 to 5 mg/kg body weight, a difference of as much as thousandfold or more, and even among rat strains there may be thousandfold differences.

== Agent Orange ==
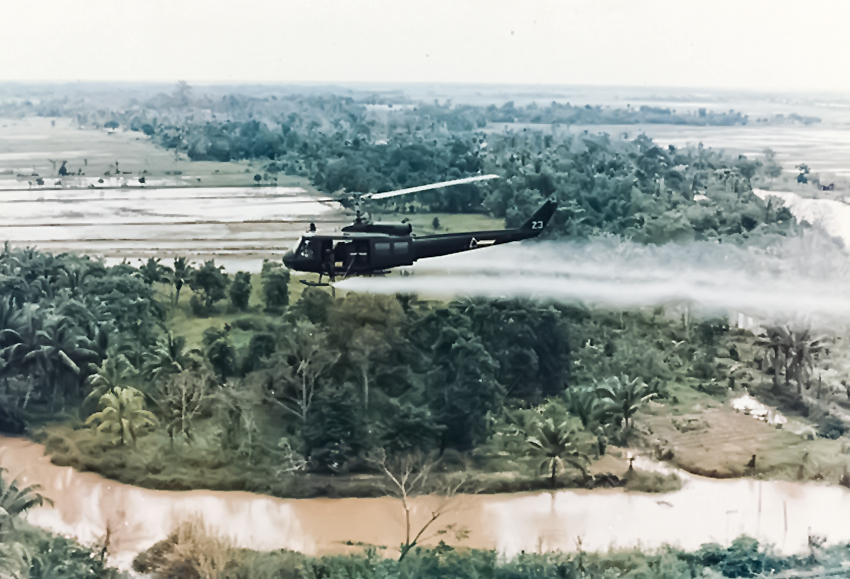
U.S. Army Huey helicopter spraying Agent Orange over Vietnamese agricultural land

Agent Orange was the code name for one of the herbicides and defoliants the U.S. military used as part of its herbicidal warfare program, Operation Ranch Hand, during the Vietnam War from 1961 to 1971. It was a mixture of 2,4,5-T and 2,4-D. The 2,4,5-T used was contaminated with 2,3,7,8-tetrachlorodibenzodioxin (TCDD), an extremely toxic dioxin compound.

During the Vietnam war, between 1962 and 1971, the United States military sprayed 20,000,000 U.S. gallons (76,000,000 L) of chemical herbicides and defoliants in Vietnam, eastern Laos and parts of Cambodia, as part of Operation Ranch Hand.

By 1971, 12% of the total area of South Vietnam had been sprayed with defoliating chemicals, which were often applied at rates that were 13 times as high as the legal USDA limit. In South Vietnam alone, an estimated 10 million hectares of agricultural land were ultimately destroyed. In some areas, TCDD concentrations in soil and water were hundreds of times greater than the levels considered safe by the U.S. Environmental Protection Agency.

According to Vietnamese Ministry of Foreign Affairs, 4.8 million Vietnamese people were exposed to Agent Orange, resulting in 400,000 people being killed or maimed, and 500,000 children born with birth defects. The Red Cross of Vietnam estimates that up to 1 million people are disabled or have health problems due to Agent Orange contamination. The United States government has challenged these figures as being unreliable and unrealistically high.

== Dioxin exposure incidents ==
- In 1949, in a Monsanto herbicide production plant for 2,4,5-T in Nitro, West Virginia, 240 people were affected when a relief valve opened.
- In 1963, a dioxin cloud escaped after an explosion in a Philips-Duphar plant (now Solvay Group) near Amsterdam. The plant was so polluted with dioxin after the accident that it had to be dismantled, embedded in concrete, and dumped into the ocean.
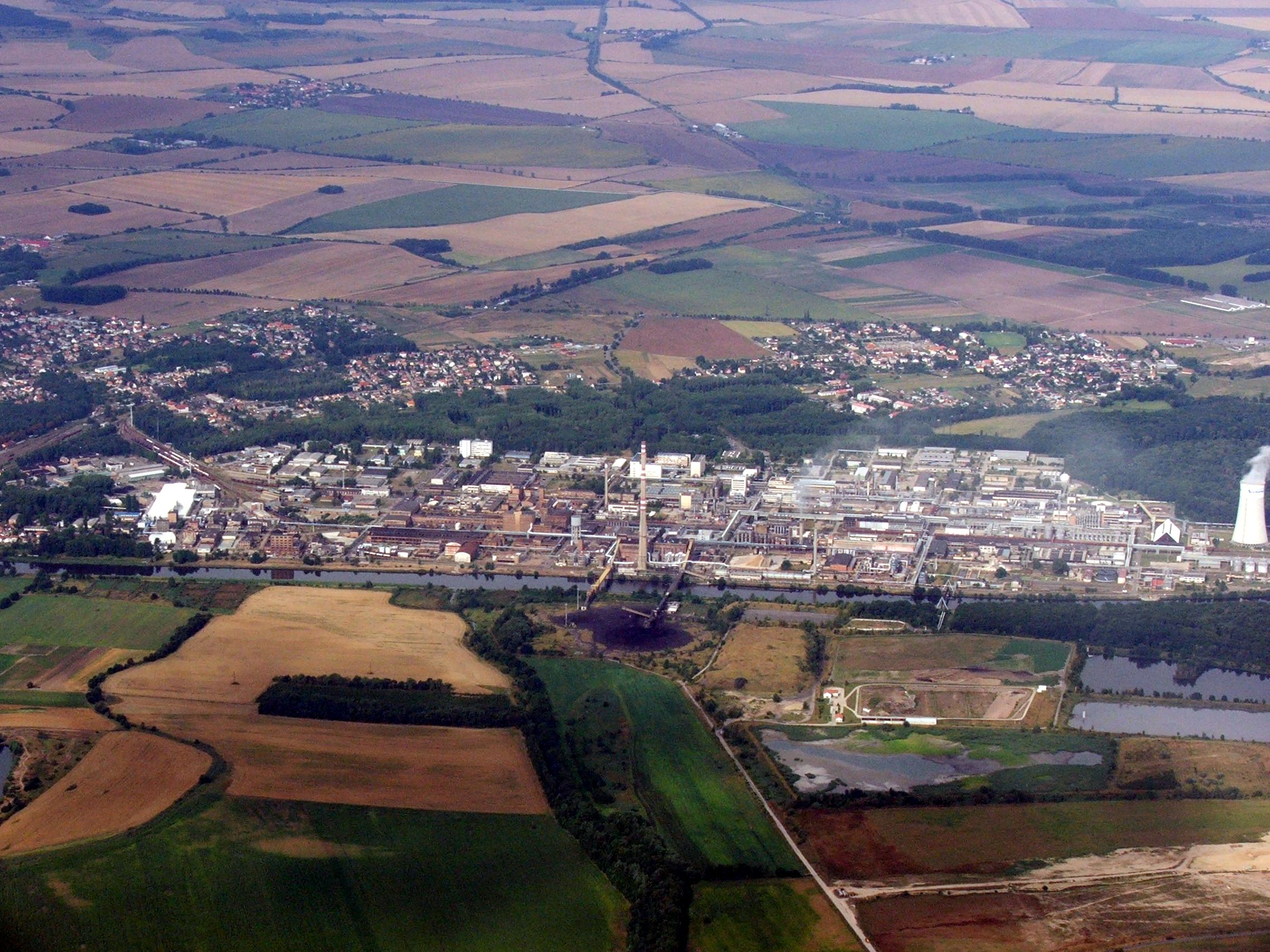
- Spolana Neratovice chloralkali plant, air view
  Between 1965 and 1968 production of 2,4,5-trichlorophenol in Spolana Neratovice plant in Czechoslovakia seriously poisoned about 60 workers with dioxins; after 3 years of investigation of the health problems of workers, Spolana stopped manufacture of 2,4,5-T (most of which was supplied to the US military in Vietnam). Several buildings of the Spolana chemical plant were heavily contaminated by dioxins. Unknown amounts of dioxins were flushed into the Elbe and Mulde rivers during the 2002 European flood, contaminating soil. Analysis of eggs and ducks found dioxin levels 15 times higher than the EU limit and a high concentration of dioxin-like PCBs in the village of Libiš. In 2004, the state health authority published a study which analysed the level of toxic substances in human blood near Spolana. According to the study, dioxin levels in Neratovice, Libiš and Tišice were about twice the level of the control group in Benešov. The quantity of dioxins near Spolana is significantly higher than the background levels in other countries. According to the US EPA, even a background level can pose a risk of cancer from 1:10000 to 1:1000, about 100 times higher than normal. The consumption of local fish, eggs, poultry, and some produce was prohibited because of post-flood contamination.
- Also during 1965 through 1968, Dr. Albert M. Kligman was contracted by the Dow Chemical Company to perform threshold tests for TCDD on inmates at Holmesburg Prison in Philadelphia after Dow studies revealed adverse effects on workers at Dow's Midland, Michigan, plant were likely due to TCDD. A subsequent test by Dow in rabbit ear models when exposed to 4–8μg usually caused a severe response. The human studies carried out in Holmesburg failed to follow Dow's original protocol and lacked proper informed consent by the participants. As a result of poor study design and subsequent destruction of records, the tests were virtually worthless even though ten inmates were exposed to 7,500μg of TCDD.
- In 1976, large amounts of dioxins were released in an industrial accident at Seveso, Italy, although no immediate human fatalities or birth defects occurred.
- In 1978, dioxins were some of the contaminants that forced the evacuation of the Love Canal neighborhood of Niagara Falls, New York.
- From 1982 through to 1985, Times Beach, Missouri, was bought out and evacuated under order of the United States Environmental Protection Agency due to high levels of dioxins in the soil caused by applications of contaminated oil meant to control dust on the town's dirt roads. The town eventually disincorporated.
- In the spring of 1990, a chemical plant Khimprom in Ufa, Russia released phenol into the water tributaries. An investigation revealed previously classified disposal of dioxin in manufacturing 2,4,5-Trichlorophenoxyacetic acid. The accident affected 670,000 people. Dioxin was found in tap water. It was assumed that it resulted from chlorophenol produced by a reaction with chlorine in water purification.
- In December 1991, an electrical explosion caused dioxins (created from the oxidation of polychlorinated biphenyl) to spread through four residence halls and two other buildings on the college campus of SUNY New Paltz.
- In May 1999, there was a dioxin crisis in Belgium: quantities of polychlorinated biphenyls with dioxin-like toxicity had entered the food chain through contaminated animal feed. 7,000,000 chickens and 60,000 pigs had to be slaughtered. This scandal was followed by a landslide change in government in the elections one month later.
- Explosions resulting from the terrorist attacks on the US on 11 September 2001, released massive amounts of dust into the air. The air was measured for dioxins from 23 September 2001, to 21 November 2001, and reported to be "likely the highest ambient concentration that have ever been reported [in history]." The United States Environmental Protection Agency report dated October 2002 and released in December 2002 titled "Exposure and Human Health Evaluation of Airborne Pollution from the World Trade Center Disaster" authored by the EPA Office of Research and Development in Washington states that dioxin levels recorded at a monitoring station on Park Row near City Hall Park in New York between 12 and 29 October 2001, averaged 5.6 parts per trillion, or nearly six times the highest dioxin level ever recorded in the U.S. Dioxin levels in the rubble of the World Trade Centers were much higher with concentrations ranging from 10 to 170 parts per trillion. The report did no measuring of the toxicity of indoor air.
- In a 2001 case study, physicians reported clinical changes in a 30-year-old woman who had been exposed to a massive dosage (144,000 pg/g blood fat) of dioxin equal to 16,000 times the normal body level; the highest dose of dioxin ever recorded in a human. She suffered from chloracne, nausea, vomiting, epigastric pain, loss of appetite, leukocytosis, anemia, amenorrhoea and thrombocytopenia. However, other notable laboratory tests, such as immune function tests, were relatively normal. The same study also covered a second subject who had received a dosage equivalent to 2,900 times the normal level, who apparently suffered no notable negative effects other than chloracne. These patients were provided with olestra to accelerate dioxin elimination.
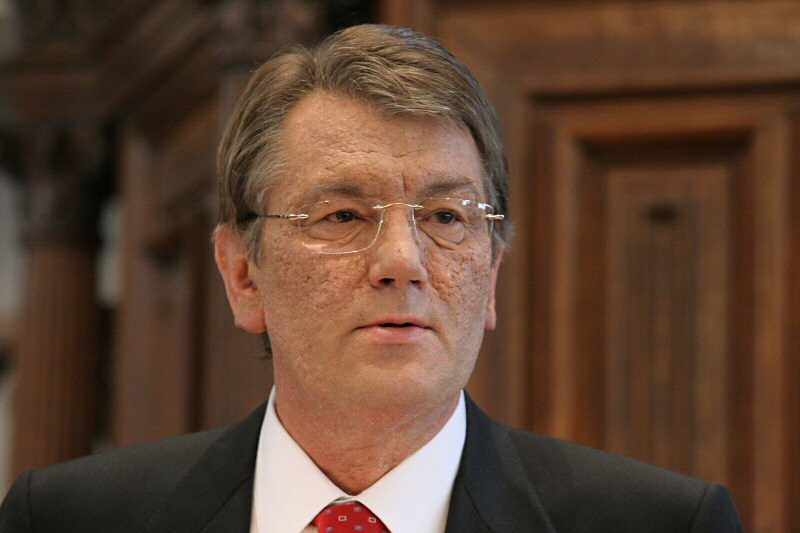
- Viktor Yushchenko with chloracne after his TCDD poisoning incident
  In 2004, in a notable individual case of dioxin poisoning, Ukrainian politician Viktor Yushchenko was exposed to the second-largest measured dose of dioxins, according to the reports of the physicians responsible for diagnosing him. This is the first known case of a single high dose of TCDD dioxin poisoning, and was diagnosed only after a toxicologist recognized the symptoms of chloracne while viewing television news coverage of his condition.
- In the early 2000s, residents of the city of New Plymouth, New Zealand, reported many illnesses of people living around and working at the Dow Chemical plant. This plant ceased production of 2,4,5-T in 1987.
- DuPont has been sued by 1,995 people who claim dioxin emissions from DuPont's plant in DeLisle, Mississippi, caused their cancers, illnesses or loved ones' deaths; of these only 850 were pending as of June 2008. In August 2005, Glen Strong, an oyster fisherman with the rare blood cancer multiple myeloma, was awarded $14 million from DuPont, but the ruling was overturned 5 June 2008, by a Mississippi jury who found DuPont's plant had no connection to Mr. Strong's disease. In another case, parents claimed dioxin from pollution caused the death of their 8-year-old daughter; the trial took place in the summer of 2007, and a jury wholly rejected the family's claims, as no scientific connection could be proven between DuPont and the family's tragic loss. DuPont's DeLisle plant is one of three titanium dioxide facilities (including Edgemoor, Delaware, and New Johnsonville, Tennessee) that are the largest producers of dioxin in the country, according to the US EPA's Toxic Release Inventory. DuPont maintains its operations are safe and environmentally responsible.
- In 2007, thousands of tonnes of foul-smelling refuse were piled up in Naples, Italy and its surrounding villages, defacing entire neighbourhoods. Authorities discovered that polychlorinated dibenzodioxins levels in buffalo milk used by 29 mozzarella makers exceeded permitted limits; after further investigation they impounded milk from 66 farms. Authorities suspected the source of the contamination was from waste illegally disposed of on land grazed by buffalo. Prosecutors in Naples placed 109 people under investigation on suspicion of fraud and food poisoning. Sales of Mozzarella cheese fell by 50% in Italy.
- In December 2008 in Ireland dioxin levels in pork were disclosed to have been between 80 and 200 times the legal limit. All Irish pork products were withdrawn from sale both nationally and internationally. In this case the dioxin toxicity was found to be mostly due to dioxin-like polychlorinated dibenzofurans and polychlorinated biphenyls, and the contribution from actual polychlorinated dibenzodioxins was relatively low. It is thought that the incident resulted from the contamination of fuel oil used in a drying burner at a single feed processor, with PCBs. The resulting combustion produced a highly toxic mixture of PCBs, dioxins and furans, which was included in the feed produced and subsequently fed to a large number of pigs.
- According to data in 2009, in 2005 the production of dioxin by the steel industry ILVA in Taranto (Italy) accounted for 90.3 per cent of the overall Italian emissions, and 8.8 per cent of the European emissions.
- In 2009, dioxins were found in high levels in farmed ducks close to sites associated with scrap metal smelting in Kaohsiung County, Taiwan.
- German dioxin incident: In January 2011 about 4700 German farms were banned from making deliveries after self-checking of an animal feed producer had shown levels of dioxin above maximum levels. This incident appeared to involve PCDDs and not PCBs. Dioxins were found in animal feed and eggs in many farms. The maximum values were exceeded twofold in feed and maximally fourfold in some individual eggs. Thus the incident was minor as compared with the Belgian crisis in 1999, and delivery bans were rapidly cleared.

== Dioxin testing ==
The analyses used to determine these compounds' relative toxicity share common elements that differ from methods used for more traditional analytical determinations. The preferred methods for dioxins and related analyses use high resolution gas chromatography/mass spectrometry (HRGC/HRMS). Concentrations are determined by measuring the ratio of the analyte to the appropriate isotopically labeled internal standard.

Also novel bio-assays like DR CALUX are nowadays used in identification of dioxins and dioxin-like compounds. The advantage in respect to HRGC/HRMS is that it is able to scan many samples at lower costs. Also it is able to detect all compounds that interact with the Ah-receptor which is responsible for carcinogenic effects.

== See also ==
- Dioxins and dioxin-like compounds
- Polychlorinated dibenzofurans (PCDFs) – A group of compounds, produced by the same conditions as dioxins and commonly co-present with dioxins in contamination incidents. They have the same toxic mode of action and are included in the toxic equivalent scheme for the purposes of assessing dioxin levels.
- Chemetco – this former copper smelter is cited in an academic study as one of the 10 highest ranking sources of dioxin pollution reaching Nunavut in the Canadian Arctic
- Polychlorinated biphenyls – A group of compounds historically used in the manufacture of electrical transformers certain members of which can also contribute to dioxin-like toxicity. These dioxin like compounds are also included in the toxic equivalent scheme when measuring dioxin levels.
