= PCB congener list =

This is a complete list of polychlorinated biphenyl (PCB) congeners.

Chemical structure of PCBs. The possible positions of chlorine atoms on the benzene rings are denoted by numbers assigned to the carbon atoms.

== PCB congener list ==
=== Explanation of PCB "descriptors" ===
Congener descriptors give a shorthand notation for geometry and substituent positions. The twelve congeners that display all four of the descriptors are referred to as being "dioxin-like", referring both to their toxicity and structural features which make them similar to 2,3,7,8-tetrachlorodibenzo-p-dioxin (2378-TCDD). Individual congeners are identified by the number and position of the chlorine atoms around the biphenyl rings.

==== CP0 / CP1 ====
These 68 coplanar congeners fall into one of two groups. The first group of 20 congeners consists of those with chlorine substitution at none of the ortho positions on the biphenyl backbone and are referred to as CP0 or non-ortho congeners. The second group of 48 congeners includes those with chlorine substitution at only one of the ortho positions and are referred to as CP1 or mono-ortho congeners.

==== 4CL ====
These 169 congeners have a total of four or more chlorine substituents, regardless of position.

==== PP ====
These 54 congeners have both para positions chlorinated.

==== 2M ====
These 140 congeners have two or more of the meta positions chlorinated.

BZ Congener Number	Formula	Name	CAS Number	InChIKey	Descriptors
0	C_{12}H_{10}	Biphenyl	92-52-4	ZUOUZKKEUPVFJK-UHFFFAOYSA-N	
1	C_{12}H_{9}Cl	2-Chlorobiphenyl	2051-60-7	LAXBNTIAOJWAOP-UHFFFAOYSA-N	CP1
2	C_{12}H_{9}Cl	3-Chlorobiphenyl	2051-61-8	NMWSKOLWZZWHPL-UHFFFAOYSA-N	CP0
3	C_{12}H_{9}Cl	4-Chlorobiphenyl	2051-62-9	FPWNLURCHDRMHC-UHFFFAOYSA-N	CP0
4	C_{12}H_{8}Cl_{2}	2,2'-Dichlorobiphenyl	13029-08-8	JAYCNKDKIKZTAF-UHFFFAOYSA-N	
5	C_{12}H_{8}Cl_{2}	2,3-Dichlorobiphenyl	16605-91-7	XOMKZKJEJBZBJJ-UHFFFAOYSA-N	CP1
6	C_{12}H_{8}Cl_{2}	2,3'-Dichlorobiphenyl	25569-80-6	ZHBBDTRJIVXKEX-UHFFFAOYSA-N	CP1
7	C_{12}H_{8}Cl_{2}	2,4-Dichlorobiphenyl	33284-50-3	WEJZHZJJXPXXMU-UHFFFAOYSA-N	CP1
8	C_{12}H_{8}Cl_{2}	2,4'-Dichlorobiphenyl	34883-43-7	UFNIBRDIUNVOMX-UHFFFAOYSA-N	CP1
9	C_{12}H_{8}Cl_{2}	2,5-Dichlorobiphenyl	34883-39-1	KKQWHYGECTYFIA-UHFFFAOYSA-N	CP1
10	C_{12}H_{8}Cl_{2}	2,6-Dichlorobiphenyl	33146-45-1	IYZWUWBAFUBNCH-UHFFFAOYSA-N	
11	C_{12}H_{8}Cl_{2}	3,3'-Dichlorobiphenyl	2050-67-1	KTXUOWUHFLBZPW-UHFFFAOYSA-N	CP0, 2M
12	C_{12}H_{8}Cl_{2}	3,4-Dichlorobiphenyl	2974-92-7	ZGHQUYZPMWMLBM-UHFFFAOYSA-N	CP0
13	C_{12}H_{8}Cl_{2}	3,4'-Dichlorobiphenyl	2974-90-5	CJDNEKOMKXLSBN-UHFFFAOYSA-N	CP0
14	C_{12}H_{8}Cl_{2}	3,5-Dichlorobiphenyl	34883-41-5	QHZSDTDMQZPUKC-UHFFFAOYSA-N	CP0, 2M
15	C_{12}H_{8}Cl_{2}	4,4'-Dichlorobiphenyl	2050-68-2	YTBRNEUEFCNVHC-UHFFFAOYSA-N	CP0, PP
16	C_{12}H_{7}Cl_{3}	2,2',3-Trichlorobiphenyl	38444-78-9	XVIZMMSINIOIQP-UHFFFAOYSA-N	
17	C_{12}H_{7}Cl_{3}	2,2',4-Trichlorobiphenyl	37680-66-3	YKKYCYQDUUXNLN-UHFFFAOYSA-N	
18	C_{12}H_{7}Cl_{3}	2,2',5-Trichlorobiphenyl	37680-65-2	DCMURXAZTZQAFB-UHFFFAOYSA-N	
19	C_{12}H_{7}Cl_{3}	2,2',6-Trichlorobiphenyl	38444-73-4	MVXIJRBBCDLNLX-UHFFFAOYSA-N	
20	C_{12}H_{7}Cl_{3}	2,3,3'-Trichlorobiphenyl	38444-84-7	SXHLTVKPNQVZGL-UHFFFAOYSA-N	CP1, 2M
21	C_{12}H_{7}Cl_{3}	2,3,4-Trichlorobiphenyl	55702-46-0	IUYHQGMDSZOPDZ-UHFFFAOYSA-N	CP1
22	C_{12}H_{7}Cl_{3}	2,3,4'-Trichlorobiphenyl	38444-85-8	ZMHWQAHZKUPENF-UHFFFAOYSA-N	CP1
23	C_{12}H_{7}Cl_{3}	2,3,5-Trichlorobiphenyl	55720-44-0	GBUCDGDROYMOAN-UHFFFAOYSA-N	CP1, 2M
24	C_{12}H_{7}Cl_{3}	2,3,6-Trichlorobiphenyl	55702-45-9	LVROLHVSYNLFBE-UHFFFAOYSA-N	
25	C_{12}H_{7}Cl_{3}	2,3',4-Trichlorobiphenyl	55712-37-3	XBBZAULFUPBZSP-UHFFFAOYSA-N	CP1
26	C_{12}H_{7}Cl_{3}	2,3',5-Trichlorobiphenyl	38444-81-4	ONNCPBRWFSKDMQ-UHFFFAOYSA-N	CP1, 2M
27	C_{12}H_{7}Cl_{3}	2,3',6-Trichlorobiphenyl	38444-76-7	VQOFJPFYTCHPTR-UHFFFAOYSA-N	
28	C_{12}H_{7}Cl_{3}	2,4,4'-Trichlorobiphenyl	7012-37-5	BZTYNSQSZHARAZ-UHFFFAOYSA-N	CP1, PP
29	C_{12}H_{7}Cl_{3}	2,4,5-Trichlorobiphenyl	15862-07-4	VGVIKVCCUATMNG-UHFFFAOYSA-N	CP1
30	C_{12}H_{7}Cl_{3}	2,4,6-Trichlorobiphenyl	35693-92-6	MTLMVEWEYZFYTH-UHFFFAOYSA-N	
31	C_{12}H_{7}Cl_{3}	2,4',5-Trichlorobiphenyl	16606-02-3	VAHKBZSAUKPEOV-UHFFFAOYSA-N	CP1
32	C_{12}H_{7}Cl_{3}	2,4',6-Trichlorobiphenyl	38444-77-8	IHIDFKLAWYPTKB-UHFFFAOYSA-N	
33	C_{12}H_{7}Cl_{3}	2,3',4'-Trichlorobiphenyl	38444-86-9	RIMXLXBUOQMDHV-UHFFFAOYSA-N	CP1
34	C_{12}H_{7}Cl_{3}	2,3',5'-Trichlorobiphenyl	37680-68-5	GXVMAQACUOSFJF-UHFFFAOYSA-N	CP1, 2M
35	C_{12}H_{7}Cl_{3}	3,3',4-Trichlorobiphenyl	37680-69-6	JHBVPKZLIBDTJR-UHFFFAOYSA-N	CP0, 2M
36	C_{12}H_{7}Cl_{3}	3,3',5-Trichlorobiphenyl	38444-87-0	RIBGNAJQTOXRDK-UHFFFAOYSA-N	CP0, 2M
37	C_{12}H_{7}Cl_{3}	3,4,4'-Trichlorobiphenyl	38444-90-5	YZANRISAORXTHU-UHFFFAOYSA-N	CP0, PP
38	C_{12}H_{7}Cl_{3}	3,4,5-Trichlorobiphenyl	53555-66-1	BSFZSQRJGZHMMV-UHFFFAOYSA-N	CP0, 2M
39	C_{12}H_{7}Cl_{3}	3,4',5-Trichlorobiphenyl	38444-88-1	SYSBNFJJSJLZMM-UHFFFAOYSA-N	CP0, 2M
40	C_{12}H_{6}Cl_{4}	2,2',3,3'-Tetrachlorobiphenyl	38444-93-8	VTLYHLREPCPDKX-UHFFFAOYSA-N	4CL, 2M
41	C_{12}H_{6}Cl_{4}	2,2',3,4-Tetrachlorobiphenyl	52663-59-9	SEWHDNLIHDBVDZ-UHFFFAOYSA-N	4CL
42	C_{12}H_{6}Cl_{4}	2,2',3,4'-Tetrachlorobiphenyl	36559-22-5	ALFHIHDQSYXSGP-UHFFFAOYSA-N	4CL
43	C_{12}H_{6}Cl_{4}	2,2',3,5-Tetrachlorobiphenyl	70362-46-8	NRBNBYFPJCCKTO-UHFFFAOYSA-N	4CL, 2M
44	C_{12}H_{6}Cl_{4}	2,2',3,5'-Tetrachlorobiphenyl	41464-39-5	ALDJIKXAHSDLLB-UHFFFAOYSA-N	4CL, 2M
45	C_{12}H_{6}Cl_{4}	2,2',3,6-Tetrachlorobiphenyl	70362-45-7	VHGHHZZTMJLTJX-UHFFFAOYSA-N	4CL
46	C_{12}H_{6}Cl_{4}	2,2',3,6'-Tetrachlorobiphenyl	41464-47-5	CUGLICQCTXWQNF-UHFFFAOYSA-N	4CL
47	C_{12}H_{6}Cl_{4}	2,2',4,4'-Tetrachlorobiphenyl	2437-79-8	QORAVNMWUNPXAO-UHFFFAOYSA-N	4CL, PP
48	C_{12}H_{6}Cl_{4}	2,2',4,5-Tetrachlorobiphenyl	70362-47-9	XBTHILIDLBPRPM-UHFFFAOYSA-N	4CL
49	C_{12}H_{6}Cl_{4}	2,2',4,5'-Tetrachlorobiphenyl	41464-40-8	ZWPVHELAQPIZHO-UHFFFAOYSA-N	4CL
50	C_{12}H_{6}Cl_{4}	2,2',4,6-Tetrachlorobiphenyl	62796-65-0	VLLVVZDKBSYMCG-UHFFFAOYSA-N	4CL
51	C_{12}H_{6}Cl_{4}	2,2',4,6'-Tetrachlorobiphenyl	68194-04-7	WVHNUGRFECMVLQ-UHFFFAOYSA-N	4CL
52	C_{12}H_{6}Cl_{4}	2,2',5,5'-Tetrachlorobiphenyl	35693-99-3	HCWZEPKLWVAEOV-UHFFFAOYSA-N	4CL, 2M
53	C_{12}H_{6}Cl_{4}	2,2',5,6'-Tetrachlorobiphenyl	41464-41-9	SFTUSTXGTCCSHX-UHFFFAOYSA-N	4CL
54	C_{12}H_{6}Cl_{4}	2,2',6,6'-Tetrachlorobiphenyl	15968-05-5	PXAGFNRKXSYIHU-UHFFFAOYSA-N	4CL
55	C_{12}H_{6}Cl_{4}	2,3,3',4-Tetrachlorobiphenyl	74338-24-2	ZKGSEEWIVLAUNH-UHFFFAOYSA-N	CP1, 4CL, 2M
56	C_{12}H_{6}Cl_{4}	2,3,3',4'-Tetrachlorobiphenyl	41464-43-1	UNCGJRRROFURDV-UHFFFAOYSA-N	CP1, 4CL, 2M
57	C_{12}H_{6}Cl_{4}	2,3,3',5-Tetrachlorobiphenyl	70424-67-8	DHDBTLFALXRTLB-UHFFFAOYSA-N	CP1, 4CL, 2M
58	C_{12}H_{6}Cl_{4}	2,3,3',5'-Tetrachlorobiphenyl	41464-49-7	IOPBNBSKOPJKEG-UHFFFAOYSA-N	CP1, 4CL, 2M
59	C_{12}H_{6}Cl_{4}	2,3,3',6-Tetrachlorobiphenyl	74472-33-6	WZNAMGYIQPAXDH-UHFFFAOYSA-N	4CL, 2M
60	C_{12}H_{6}Cl_{4}	2,3,4,4'-Tetrachlorobiphenyl	33025-41-1	XLDBTRJKXLKYTC-UHFFFAOYSA-N	CP1, 4CL, PP
61	C_{12}H_{6}Cl_{4}	2,3,4,5-Tetrachlorobiphenyl	33284-53-6	HLQDGCWIOSOMDP-UHFFFAOYSA-N	CP1, 4CL, 2M
62	C_{12}H_{6}Cl_{4}	2,3,4,6-Tetrachlorobiphenyl	54230-22-7	HOBRTVXSIVSXIA-UHFFFAOYSA-N	4CL
63	C_{12}H_{6}Cl_{4}	2,3,4',5-Tetrachlorobiphenyl	74472-34-7	CITMYAMXIZQCJD-UHFFFAOYSA-N	CP1, 4CL, 2M
64	C_{12}H_{6}Cl_{4}	2,3,4',6-Tetrachlorobiphenyl	52663-58-8	FXRXQYZZALWWGA-UHFFFAOYSA-N	4CL
65	C_{12}H_{6}Cl_{4}	2,3,5,6-Tetrachlorobiphenyl	33284-54-7	BLAYIQLVUNIICD-UHFFFAOYSA-N	4CL, 2M
66	C_{12}H_{6}Cl_{4}	2,3',4,4'-Tetrachlorobiphenyl	32598-10-0	RKLLTEAEZIJBAU-UHFFFAOYSA-N	CP1, 4CL, PP
67	C_{12}H_{6}Cl_{4}	2,3',4,5-Tetrachlorobiphenyl	73575-53-8	LQEGJNOKOZHBBZ-UHFFFAOYSA-N	CP1, 4CL, 2M
68	C_{12}H_{6}Cl_{4}	2,3',4,5'-Tetrachlorobiphenyl	73575-52-7	KTTXLLZIBIDUCR-UHFFFAOYSA-N	CP1, 4CL, 2M
69	C_{12}H_{6}Cl_{4}	2,3',4,6-Tetrachlorobiphenyl	60233-24-1	CKUBKYSLNCKBOI-UHFFFAOYSA-N	4CL
70	C_{12}H_{6}Cl_{4}	2,3',4',5-Tetrachlorobiphenyl	32598-11-1	KENZYIHFBRWMOD-UHFFFAOYSA-N	CP1, 4CL, 2M
71	C_{12}H_{6}Cl_{4}	2,3',4',6-Tetrachlorobiphenyl	41464-46-4	WYVBETQIUHPLFO-UHFFFAOYSA-N	4CL
72	C_{12}H_{6}Cl_{4}	2,3',5,5'-Tetrachlorobiphenyl	41464-42-0	WBTMFEPLVQOWFI-UHFFFAOYSA-N	CP1, 4CL, 2M
73	C_{12}H_{6}Cl_{4}	2,3',5',6-Tetrachlorobiphenyl	74338-23-1	HDULUCZRGGWTMZ-UHFFFAOYSA-N	4CL, 2M
74	C_{12}H_{6}Cl_{4}	2,4,4',5-Tetrachlorobiphenyl	32690-93-0	TULCXSBAPHCWCF-UHFFFAOYSA-N	CP1, 4CL, PP
75	C_{12}H_{6}Cl_{4}	2,4,4',6-Tetrachlorobiphenyl	32598-12-2	RZFZBHKDGHISSH-UHFFFAOYSA-N	4CL, PP
76	C_{12}H_{6}Cl_{4}	2,3',4',5'-Tetrachlorobiphenyl	70362-48-0	QILUYCYPNYWMIL-UHFFFAOYSA-N	CP1, 4CL, 2M
77	C_{12}H_{6}Cl_{4}	3,3',4,4'-Tetrachlorobiphenyl	32598-13-3	UQMGJOKDKOLIDP-UHFFFAOYSA-N	CP0, 4CL, PP, 2M
78	C_{12}H_{6}Cl_{4}	3,3',4,5-Tetrachlorobiphenyl	70362-49-1	SXFLURRQRFKBNN-UHFFFAOYSA-N	CP0, 4CL, 2M
79	C_{12}H_{6}Cl_{4}	3,3',4,5'-Tetrachlorobiphenyl	41464-48-6	QLCTXEMDCZGPCG-UHFFFAOYSA-N	CP0, 4CL, 2M
80	C_{12}H_{6}Cl_{4}	3,3',5,5'-Tetrachlorobiphenyl	33284-52-5	UTMWFJSRHLYRPY-UHFFFAOYSA-N	CP0, 4CL, 2M
81	C_{12}H_{6}Cl_{4}	3,4,4',5-Tetrachlorobiphenyl	70362-50-4	BHWVLZJTVIYLIV-UHFFFAOYSA-N	CP0, 4CL, PP, 2M
82	C_{12}H_{5}Cl_{5}	2,2',3,3',4-Pentachlorobiphenyl	52663-62-4	AUGNBQPSMWGAJE-UHFFFAOYSA-N	4CL, 2M
83	C_{12}H_{5}Cl_{5}	2,2',3,3',5-Pentachlorobiphenyl	60145-20-2	SUBRHHYLRGOTHL-UHFFFAOYSA-N	4CL, 2M
84	C_{12}H_{5}Cl_{5}	2,2',3,3',6-Pentachlorobiphenyl	52663-60-2	QVWUJLANSDKRAH-UHFFFAOYSA-N	4CL, 2M
85	C_{12}H_{5}Cl_{5}	2,2',3,4,4'-Pentachlorobiphenyl	65510-45-4	LACXVZHAJMVESG-UHFFFAOYSA-N	4CL, PP
86	C_{12}H_{5}Cl_{5}	2,2',3,4,5-Pentachlorobiphenyl	55312-69-1	AIURIRUDHVDRFQ-UHFFFAOYSA-N	4CL, 2M
87	C_{12}H_{5}Cl_{5}	2,2',3,4,5'-Pentachlorobiphenyl	38380-02-8	OPKYDBFRKPQCBS-UHFFFAOYSA-N	4CL, 2M
88	C_{12}H_{5}Cl_{5}	2,2',3,4,6-Pentachlorobiphenyl	55215-17-3	QGDKRLQRLFUJPP-UHFFFAOYSA-N	4CL
89	C_{12}H_{5}Cl_{5}	2,2',3,4,6'-Pentachlorobiphenyl	73575-57-2	GLOOIONSKMZYQZ-UHFFFAOYSA-N	4CL
90	C_{12}H_{5}Cl_{5}	2,2',3,4',5-Pentachlorobiphenyl	68194-07-0	SUOAMBOBSWRMNQ-UHFFFAOYSA-N	4CL, 2M
91	C_{12}H_{5}Cl_{5}	2,2',3,4',6-Pentachlorobiphenyl	68194-05-8	CXKIGWXPPVZSQK-UHFFFAOYSA-N	4CL
92	C_{12}H_{5}Cl_{5}	2,2',3,5,5'-Pentachlorobiphenyl	52663-61-3	CRCBRZBVCDKPGA-UHFFFAOYSA-N	4CL, 2M
93	C_{12}H_{5}Cl_{5}	2,2',3,5,6-Pentachlorobiphenyl	73575-56-1	BMXRLHMJGHJGLR-UHFFFAOYSA-N	4CL, 2M
94	C_{12}H_{5}Cl_{5}	2,2',3,5,6'-Pentachlorobiphenyl	73575-55-0	FJUVPPYNSDTRQV-UHFFFAOYSA-N	4CL, 2M
95	C_{12}H_{5}Cl_{5}	2,2',3,5',6-Pentachlorobiphenyl	38379-99-6	GXNNLIMMEXHBKV-UHFFFAOYSA-N	4CL, 2M
96	C_{12}H_{5}Cl_{5}	2,2',3,6,6'-Pentachlorobiphenyl	73575-54-9	QQFGAXUIQVKBKU-UHFFFAOYSA-N	4CL
97	C_{12}H_{5}Cl_{5}	2,2',3,4',5'-Pentachlorobiphenyl	41464-51-1	JTUSORDQZVOEAZ-UHFFFAOYSA-N	4CL, 2M
98	C_{12}H_{5}Cl_{5}	2,2',3,4',6'-Pentachlorobiphenyl	60233-25-2	GOFFZTAPOOICFT-UHFFFAOYSA-N	4CL
99	C_{12}H_{5}Cl_{5}	2,2',4,4',5-Pentachlorobiphenyl	38380-01-7	LMQJBFRGXHMNOX-UHFFFAOYSA-N	4CL, PP
100	C_{12}H_{5}Cl_{5}	2,2',4,4',6-Pentachlorobiphenyl	39485-83-1	RKUAZJIXKHPFRK-UHFFFAOYSA-N	4CL, PP
101	C_{12}H_{5}Cl_{5}	2,2',4,5,5'-Pentachlorobiphenyl	37680-73-2	LAHWLEDBADHJGA-UHFFFAOYSA-N	4CL, 2M
102	C_{12}H_{5}Cl_{5}	2,2',4,5,6'-Pentachlorobiphenyl	68194-06-9	BWWVXHRLMPBDCK-UHFFFAOYSA-N	4CL
103	C_{12}H_{5}Cl_{5}	2,2',4,5',6-Pentachlorobiphenyl	60145-21-3	PQHZWWBJPCNNGI-UHFFFAOYSA-N	4CL
104	C_{12}H_{5}Cl_{5}	2,2',4,6,6'-Pentachlorobiphenyl	56558-16-8	MTCPZNVSDFCBBE-UHFFFAOYSA-N	4CL
105	C_{12}H_{5}Cl_{5}	2,3,3',4,4'-Pentachlorobiphenyl	32598-14-4	WIDHRBRBACOVOY-UHFFFAOYSA-N	CP1, 4CL, PP, 2M
106	C_{12}H_{5}Cl_{5}	2,3,3',4,5-Pentachlorobiphenyl	70424-69-0	BQENMISTWGTJIJ-UHFFFAOYSA-N	CP1, 4CL, 2M
107	C_{12}H_{5}Cl_{5}	2,3,3',4',5-Pentachlorobiphenyl	70424-68-9	PVYBHVJTMRRXLG-UHFFFAOYSA-N	CP1, 4CL, 2M
108	C_{12}H_{5}Cl_{5}	2,3,3',4,5'-Pentachlorobiphenyl	70362-41-3	MPCDNZSLJWJDNW-UHFFFAOYSA-N	CP1, 4CL, 2M
109	C_{12}H_{5}Cl_{5}	2,3,3',4,6-Pentachlorobiphenyl	74472-35-8	XGQBSVVYMVILEL-UHFFFAOYSA-N	4CL, 2M
110	C_{12}H_{5}Cl_{5}	2,3,3',4',6-Pentachlorobiphenyl	38380-03-9	ARXHIJMGSIYYRZ-UHFFFAOYSA-N	4CL, 2M
111	C_{12}H_{5}Cl_{5}	2,3,3',5,5'-Pentachlorobiphenyl	39635-32-0	QMUDLTGWHILKHH-UHFFFAOYSA-N	CP1, 4CL, 2M
112	C_{12}H_{5}Cl_{5}	2,3,3',5,6-Pentachlorobiphenyl	74472-36-9	NTKSJAPQYKCFPP-UHFFFAOYSA-N	4CL, 2M
113	C_{12}H_{5}Cl_{5}	2,3,3',5',6-Pentachlorobiphenyl	68194-10-5	YDGFMDPEJCJZEV-UHFFFAOYSA-N	4CL, 2M
114	C_{12}H_{5}Cl_{5}	2,3,4,4',5-Pentachlorobiphenyl	74472-37-0	SXZSFWHOSHAKMN-UHFFFAOYSA-N	CP1, 4CL, PP, 2M
115	C_{12}H_{5}Cl_{5}	2,3,4,4',6-Pentachlorobiphenyl	74472-38-1	IOVARPVVZDOPGQ-UHFFFAOYSA-N	4CL, PP
116	C_{12}H_{5}Cl_{5}	2,3,4,5,6-Pentachlorobiphenyl	18259-05-7	GGMPTLAAIUQMIE-UHFFFAOYSA-N	4CL, 2M
117	C_{12}H_{5}Cl_{5}	2,3,4',5,6-Pentachlorobiphenyl	68194-11-6	ZDDZPDTVCZLFFC-UHFFFAOYSA-N	4CL, 2M
118	C_{12}H_{5}Cl_{5}	2,3',4,4',5-Pentachlorobiphenyl	31508-00-6	IUTPYMGCWINGEY-UHFFFAOYSA-N	CP1, 4CL, PP, 2M
119	C_{12}H_{5}Cl_{5}	2,3',4,4',6-Pentachlorobiphenyl	56558-17-9	OAEQTHQGPZKTQP-UHFFFAOYSA-N	4CL, PP
120	C_{12}H_{5}Cl_{5}	2,3',4,5,5'-Pentachlorobiphenyl	68194-12-7	ZLGYJAIAVPVCNF-UHFFFAOYSA-N	CP1, 4CL, 2M
121	C_{12}H_{5}Cl_{5}	2,3',4,5',6-Pentachlorobiphenyl	56558-18-0	XBVSGJGMWSKAKL-UHFFFAOYSA-N	4CL, 2M
122	C_{12}H_{5}Cl_{5}	2,3,3',4',5'-Pentachlorobiphenyl	76842-07-4	GWOWBISZHLPYEK-UHFFFAOYSA-N	CP1, 4CL, 2M
123	C_{12}H_{5}Cl_{5}	2,3',4,4',5'-Pentachlorobiphenyl	65510-44-3	YAHNWSSFXMVPOU-UHFFFAOYSA-N	CP1, 4CL, PP, 2M
124	C_{12}H_{5}Cl_{5}	2,3',4',5,5'-Pentachlorobiphenyl	70424-70-3	PIVBPZFQXKMHBD-UHFFFAOYSA-N	CP1, 4CL, 2M
125	C_{12}H_{5}Cl_{5}	2,3',4',5',6-Pentachlorobiphenyl	74472-39-2	WAZUWHGJMMZVHH-UHFFFAOYSA-N	4CL, 2M
126	C_{12}H_{5}Cl_{5}	3,3',4,4',5-Pentachlorobiphenyl	57465-28-8	REHONNLQRWTIFF-UHFFFAOYSA-N	CP0, 4CL, PP, 2M
127	C_{12}H_{5}Cl_{5}	3,3',4,5,5'-Pentachlorobiphenyl	39635-33-1	MXVAYAXIPRGORY-UHFFFAOYSA-N	CP0, 4CL, 2M
128	C_{12}H_{4}Cl_{6}	2,2',3,3',4,4'-Hexachlorobiphenyl	38380-07-3	BTAGRXWGMYTPBY-UHFFFAOYSA-N	4CL, PP, 2M
129	C_{12}H_{4}Cl_{6}	2,2',3,3',4,5-Hexachlorobiphenyl	55215-18-4	VQQKIXKPMJTUMP-UHFFFAOYSA-N	4CL, 2M
130	C_{12}H_{4}Cl_{6}	2,2',3,3',4,5'-Hexachlorobiphenyl	52663-66-8	YFSLABAYQDPWPF-UHFFFAOYSA-N	4CL, 2M
131	C_{12}H_{4}Cl_{6}	2,2',3,3',4,6-Hexachlorobiphenyl	61798-70-7	WDLTVNWWEZJMPF-UHFFFAOYSA-N	4CL, 2M
132	C_{12}H_{4}Cl_{6}	2,2',3,3',4,6'-Hexachlorobiphenyl	38380-05-1	OKBJVIVEFXPEOU-UHFFFAOYSA-N	4CL, 2M
133	C_{12}H_{4}Cl_{6}	2,2',3,3',5,5'-Hexachlorobiphenyl	35694-04-3	AJKLKINFZLWHQE-UHFFFAOYSA-N	4CL, 2M
134	C_{12}H_{4}Cl_{6}	2,2',3,3',5,6-Hexachlorobiphenyl	52704-70-8	RVWLHPJFOKUPNM-UHFFFAOYSA-N	4CL, 2M
135	C_{12}H_{4}Cl_{6}	2,2',3,3',5,6'-Hexachlorobiphenyl	52744-13-5	UUTNFLRSJBQQJM-UHFFFAOYSA-N	4CL, 2M
136	C_{12}H_{4}Cl_{6}	2,2',3,3',6,6'-Hexachlorobiphenyl	38411-22-2	FZFUUSROAHKTTF-UHFFFAOYSA-N	4CL, 2M
137	C_{12}H_{4}Cl_{6}	2,2',3,4,4',5-Hexachlorobiphenyl	35694-06-5	CKLLRBPBZLTGDJ-UHFFFAOYSA-N	4CL, PP, 2M
138	C_{12}H_{4}Cl_{6}	2,2',3,4,4',5'-Hexachlorobiphenyl	35065-28-2	RPUMZMSNLZHIGZ-UHFFFAOYSA-N	4CL, PP, 2M
139	C_{12}H_{4}Cl_{6}	2,2',3,4,4',6-Hexachlorobiphenyl	56030-56-9	SPOPSCCFZQFGDL-UHFFFAOYSA-N	4CL, PP
140	C_{12}H_{4}Cl_{6}	2,2',3,4,4',6'-Hexachlorobiphenyl	59291-64-4	XBBRGUHRZBZMPP-UHFFFAOYSA-N	4CL, PP
141	C_{12}H_{4}Cl_{6}	2,2',3,4,5,5'-Hexachlorobiphenyl	52712-04-6	UCLKLGIYGBLTSM-UHFFFAOYSA-N	4CL, 2M
142	C_{12}H_{4}Cl_{6}	2,2',3,4,5,6-Hexachlorobiphenyl	41411-61-4	RUEIBQJFGMERJD-UHFFFAOYSA-N	4CL, 2M
143	C_{12}H_{4}Cl_{6}	2,2',3,4,5,6'-Hexachlorobiphenyl	68194-15-0	UQPQKLGBEKEZBV-UHFFFAOYSA-N	4CL, 2M
144	C_{12}H_{4}Cl_{6}	2,2',3,4,5',6-Hexachlorobiphenyl	68194-14-9	CXXRQFOKRZJAJA-UHFFFAOYSA-N	4CL, 2M
145	C_{12}H_{4}Cl_{6}	2,2',3,4,6,6'-Hexachlorobiphenyl	74472-40-5	JZFZCLFEPXCRCA-UHFFFAOYSA-N	4CL
146	C_{12}H_{4}Cl_{6}	2,2',3,4',5,5'-Hexachlorobiphenyl	51908-16-8	BQHCQAQLTCQFJZ-UHFFFAOYSA-N	4CL, 2M
147	C_{12}H_{4}Cl_{6}	2,2',3,4',5,6-Hexachlorobiphenyl	68194-13-8	AQONCPKMJSBHQT-UHFFFAOYSA-N	4CL, 2M
148	C_{12}H_{4}Cl_{6}	2,2',3,4',5,6'-Hexachlorobiphenyl	74472-41-6	CTVRBEKNQHJPLX-UHFFFAOYSA-N	4CL, 2M
149	C_{12}H_{4}Cl_{6}	2,2',3,4',5',6-Hexachlorobiphenyl	38380-04-0	LKHLFUVHHXCNJH-UHFFFAOYSA-N	4CL, 2M
150	C_{12}H_{4}Cl_{6}	2,2',3,4',6,6'-Hexachlorobiphenyl	68194-08-1	RPPNJBZNXQNKNM-UHFFFAOYSA-N	4CL
151	C_{12}H_{4}Cl_{6}	2,2',3,5,5',6-Hexachlorobiphenyl	52663-63-5	UHCLFIWDCYOTOL-UHFFFAOYSA-N	4CL, 2M
152	C_{12}H_{4}Cl_{6}	2,2',3,5,6,6'-Hexachlorobiphenyl	68194-09-2	CLODVDBWNVQLGO-UHFFFAOYSA-N	4CL, 2M
153	C_{12}H_{4}Cl_{6}	2,2',4,4',5,5'-Hexachlorobiphenyl	35065-27-1	MVWHGTYKUMDIHL-UHFFFAOYSA-N	4CL, PP, 2M
154	C_{12}H_{4}Cl_{6}	2,2',4,4',5,6'-Hexachlorobiphenyl	60145-22-4	QXZHEJWDLVUFFB-UHFFFAOYSA-N	4CL, PP
155	C_{12}H_{4}Cl_{6}	2,2',4,4',6,6'-Hexachlorobiphenyl	33979-03-2	ICOAEPDGFWLUTI-UHFFFAOYSA-N	4CL, PP
156	C_{12}H_{4}Cl_{6}	2,3,3',4,4',5-Hexachlorobiphenyl	38380-08-4	LCXMEXLGMKFLQO-UHFFFAOYSA-N	CP1, 4CL, PP, 2M
157	C_{12}H_{4}Cl_{6}	2,3,3',4,4',5'-Hexachlorobiphenyl	69782-90-7	YTWXDQVNPCIEOX-UHFFFAOYSA-N	CP1, 4CL, PP, 2M
158	C_{12}H_{4}Cl_{6}	2,3,3',4,4',6-Hexachlorobiphenyl	74472-42-7	ZQUPQXINXTWCQR-UHFFFAOYSA-N	4CL, PP, 2M
159	C_{12}H_{4}Cl_{6}	2,3,3',4,5,5'-Hexachlorobiphenyl	39635-35-3	YZKLGRAIIIGOHB-UHFFFAOYSA-N	CP1, 4CL, 2M
160	C_{12}H_{4}Cl_{6}	2,3,3',4,5,6-Hexachlorobiphenyl	41411-62-5	JHJMZCXLJXRCHK-UHFFFAOYSA-N	4CL, 2M
161	C_{12}H_{4}Cl_{6}	2,3,3',4,5',6-Hexachlorobiphenyl	74472-43-8	UNPTZXSJGZTGJJ-UHFFFAOYSA-N	4CL, 2M
162	C_{12}H_{4}Cl_{6}	2,3,3',4',5,5'-Hexachlorobiphenyl	39635-34-2	AHZUOPSGLWYCNF-UHFFFAOYSA-N	CP1, 4CL, 2M
163	C_{12}H_{4}Cl_{6}	2,3,3',4',5,6-Hexachlorobiphenyl	74472-44-9	ZAGRQXMWMRUYRB-UHFFFAOYSA-N	4CL, 2M
164	C_{12}H_{4}Cl_{6}	2,3,3',4',5',6-Hexachlorobiphenyl	74472-45-0	HAZQOLYHFUUJJN-UHFFFAOYSA-N	4CL, 2M
165	C_{12}H_{4}Cl_{6}	2,3,3',5,5',6-Hexachlorobiphenyl	74472-46-1	ZEATXTCWXKQPHO-UHFFFAOYSA-N	4CL, 2M
166	C_{12}H_{4}Cl_{6}	2,3,4,4',5,6-Hexachlorobiphenyl	41411-63-6	BTOCFTAWZMMTNB-UHFFFAOYSA-N	4CL, PP, 2M
167	C_{12}H_{4}Cl_{6}	2,3',4,4',5,5'-Hexachlorobiphenyl	52663-72-6	AZXHAWRMEPZSSV-UHFFFAOYSA-N	CP1, 4CL, PP, 2M
168	C_{12}H_{4}Cl_{6}	2,3',4,4',5',6-Hexachlorobiphenyl	59291-65-5	PITHIPNORFGJPI-UHFFFAOYSA-N	4CL, PP, 2M
169	C_{12}H_{4}Cl_{6}	3,3',4,4',5,5'-Hexachlorobiphenyl	32774-16-6	ZHLICBPIXDOFFG-UHFFFAOYSA-N	CP0, 4CL, PP, 2M
170	C_{12}H_{3}Cl_{7}	2,2',3,3',4,4',5-Heptachlorobiphenyl	35065-30-6	RMPWIIKNWPVWNG-UHFFFAOYSA-N	4CL, PP, 2M
171	C_{12}H_{3}Cl_{7}	2,2',3,3',4,4',6-Heptachlorobiphenyl	52663-71-5	TZMHVHLTPWKZCI-UHFFFAOYSA-N	4CL, PP, 2M
172	C_{12}H_{3}Cl_{7}	2,2',3,3',4,5,5'-Heptachlorobiphenyl	52663-74-8	HOPMUCXYRNOABF-UHFFFAOYSA-N	4CL, 2M
173	C_{12}H_{3}Cl_{7}	2,2',3,3',4,5,6-Heptachlorobiphenyl	68194-16-1	PAYFWJAKKLILIT-UHFFFAOYSA-N	4CL, 2M
174	C_{12}H_{3}Cl_{7}	2,2',3,3',4,5,6'-Heptachlorobiphenyl	38411-25-5	ZDLMBNHYTPHDLF-UHFFFAOYSA-N	4CL, 2M
175	C_{12}H_{3}Cl_{7}	2,2',3,3',4,5',6-Heptachlorobiphenyl	40186-70-7	KJBDZJFSYQUNJT-UHFFFAOYSA-N	4CL, 2M
176	C_{12}H_{3}Cl_{7}	2,2',3,3',4,6,6'-Heptachlorobiphenyl	52663-65-7	HGMYRFJAJNYBRX-UHFFFAOYSA-N	4CL, 2M
177	C_{12}H_{3}Cl_{7}	2,2',3,3',4,5',6'-Heptachlorobiphenyl	52663-70-4	CXOYNJAHPUASHN-UHFFFAOYSA-N	4CL, 2M
178	C_{12}H_{3}Cl_{7}	2,2',3,3',5,5',6-Heptachlorobiphenyl	52663-67-9	WCIBKXHMIXUQHK-UHFFFAOYSA-N	4CL, 2M
179	C_{12}H_{3}Cl_{7}	2,2',3,3',5,6,6'-Heptachlorobiphenyl	52663-64-6	XYHVYEUZLSYHDP-UHFFFAOYSA-N	4CL, 2M
180	C_{12}H_{3}Cl_{7}	2,2',3,4,4',5,5'-Heptachlorobiphenyl	35065-29-3	WBHQEUPUMONIKF-UHFFFAOYSA-N	4CL, PP, 2M
181	C_{12}H_{3}Cl_{7}	2,2',3,4,4',5,6-Heptachlorobiphenyl	74472-47-2	DJEUXBQAKBLKPO-UHFFFAOYSA-N	4CL, PP, 2M
182	C_{12}H_{3}Cl_{7}	2,2',3,4,4',5,6'-Heptachlorobiphenyl	60145-23-5	RXRLRYZUMSYVLS-UHFFFAOYSA-N	4CL, PP, 2M
183	C_{12}H_{3}Cl_{7}	2,2',3,4,4',5',6-Heptachlorobiphenyl	52663-69-1	KQBFUDNJKCZEDQ-UHFFFAOYSA-N	4CL, PP, 2M
184	C_{12}H_{3}Cl_{7}	2,2',3,4,4',6,6'-Heptachlorobiphenyl	74472-48-3	OBIUJJSQKPGKME-UHFFFAOYSA-N	4CL, PP
185	C_{12}H_{3}Cl_{7}	2,2',3,4,5,5',6-Heptachlorobiphenyl	52712-05-7	PYZHTHZEHQHHEN-UHFFFAOYSA-N	4CL, 2M
186	C_{12}H_{3}Cl_{7}	2,2',3,4,5,6,6'-Heptachlorobiphenyl	74472-49-4	FGDPOTMRBQHPJK-UHFFFAOYSA-N	4CL, 2M
187	C_{12}H_{3}Cl_{7}	2,2',3,4',5,5',6-Heptachlorobiphenyl	52663-68-0	UDMZPLROONOSEF-UHFFFAOYSA-N	4CL, 2M
188	C_{12}H_{3}Cl_{7}	2,2',3,4',5,6,6'-Heptachlorobiphenyl	74487-85-7	MMTJWDQKGUNSDK-UHFFFAOYSA-N	4CL, 2M
189	C_{12}H_{3}Cl_{7}	2,3,3',4,4',5,5'-Heptachlorobiphenyl	39635-31-9	XUAWBXBYHDRROL-UHFFFAOYSA-N	CP1, 4CL, PP, 2M
190	C_{12}H_{3}Cl_{7}	2,3,3',4,4',5,6-Heptachlorobiphenyl	41411-64-7	TYEDCFVCFDKSBK-UHFFFAOYSA-N	4CL, PP, 2M
191	C_{12}H_{3}Cl_{7}	2,3,3',4,4',5',6-Heptachlorobiphenyl	74472-50-7	TVFXBXWAXIMLAQ-UHFFFAOYSA-N	4CL, PP, 2M
192	C_{12}H_{3}Cl_{7}	2,3,3',4,5,5',6-Heptachlorobiphenyl	74472-51-8	ZUTDUGMNROUBOX-UHFFFAOYSA-N	4CL, 2M
193	C_{12}H_{3}Cl_{7}	2,3,3',4',5,5',6-Heptachlorobiphenyl	69782-91-8	SSTJUBQGYXNFFP-UHFFFAOYSA-N	4CL, 2M
194	C_{12}H_{2}Cl_{8}	2,2',3,3',4,4',5,5'-Octachlorobiphenyl	35694-08-7	DTMRKGRREZAYAP-UHFFFAOYSA-N	4CL, PP, 2M
195	C_{12}H_{2}Cl_{8}	2,2',3,3',4,4',5,6-Octachlorobiphenyl	52663-78-2	JAHJITLFJSDRCG-UHFFFAOYSA-N	4CL, PP, 2M
196	C_{12}H_{2}Cl_{8}	2,2',3,3',4,4',5,6'-Octachlorobiphenyl	42740-50-1	BQFCCUSDZLKBJG-UHFFFAOYSA-N	4CL, PP, 2M
197	C_{12}H_{2}Cl_{8}	2,2',3,3',4,4',6,6'-Octachlorobiphenyl	33091-17-7	YPDBBDKYNWRFMF-UHFFFAOYSA-N	4CL, PP, 2M
198	C_{12}H_{2}Cl_{8}	2,2',3,3',4,5,5',6-Octachlorobiphenyl	68194-17-2	PJHBSPRZHUOIAS-UHFFFAOYSA-N	4CL, 2M
199	C_{12}H_{2}Cl_{8}	2,2',3,3',4,5,5',6'-Octachlorobiphenyl	52663-75-9	HJBYDWKNARZTMJ-UHFFFAOYSA-N	4CL, 2M
200	C_{12}H_{2}Cl_{8}	2,2',3,3',4,5,6,6'-Octachlorobiphenyl	52663-73-7	HHXNVASVVVNNDG-UHFFFAOYSA-N	4CL, 2M
201	C_{12}H_{2}Cl_{8}	2,2',3,3',4,5',6,6'-Octachlorobiphenyl	40186-71-8	LJQOBQLZTUSEJA-UHFFFAOYSA-N	4CL, 2M
202	C_{12}H_{2}Cl_{8}	2,2',3,3',5,5',6,6'-Octachlorobiphenyl	2136-99-4	JPOPEORRMSDUIP-UHFFFAOYSA-N	4CL, 2M
203	C_{12}H_{2}Cl_{8}	2,2',3,4,4',5,5',6-Octachlorobiphenyl	52663-76-0	DCPDZFRGNJDWPP-UHFFFAOYSA-N	4CL, PP, 2M
204	C_{12}H_{2}Cl_{8}	2,2',3,4,4',5,6,6'-Octachlorobiphenyl	74472-52-9	JDZUWXRNKHXZFE-UHFFFAOYSA-N	4CL, PP, 2M
205	C_{12}H_{2}Cl_{8}	2,3,3',4,4',5,5',6-Octachlorobiphenyl	74472-53-0	VXXBCDUYUQKWCK-UHFFFAOYSA-N	4CL, PP, 2M
206	C_{12}HCl_{9}	2,2',3,3',4,4',5,5',6-Nonachlorobiphenyl	40186-72-9	JFIMDKGRGPNPRQ-UHFFFAOYSA-N	4CL, PP, 2M
207	C_{12}HCl_{9}	2,2',3,3',4,4',5,6,6'-Nonachlorobiphenyl	52663-79-3	YGDPIDTZOQGPAX-UHFFFAOYSA-N	4CL, PP, 2M
208	C_{12}HCl_{9}	2,2',3,3',4,5,5',6,6'-Nonachlorobiphenyl	52663-77-1	XIFFTDRFWYFAPO-UHFFFAOYSA-N	4CL, 2M
209	C_{12}Cl_{10}	Decachlorobiphenyl	2051-24-3	ONXPZLFXDMAPRO-UHFFFAOYSA-N	4CL, PP, 2M
