= Dioxin duck incident =

2009 food contamination incident in Taiwan

The Dioxin Duck Incident was a case of dioxin contamination at a duck farm that occurred in November 2009 in Kaohsiung County, Taiwan. In November 2009, ducks at a farm located on Xinzuo Road in Daliao Township, Kaohsiung County, were found to contain dioxin levels exceeding safety standards by two to six times. The contamination was suspected to have originated from waste materials such as slag produced by scrap metal smelting. In response, the county government’s Environmental Protection Bureau, in coordination with the Ministry of Environment, culled more than 9,000 ducks.

The duck farm involved in the incident had been operating without official approval and was therefore considered illegal. The operator was fined by government authorities and claimed that the contaminated ducks were the first batch raised at the farm and had not yet matured, asserting that none had entered the market. However, local residents stated that the duck farm had existed for more than a decade, contradicting the operator’s claim. Some scholars also pointed out that duck farming activities in the area had already been observed three years earlier. At the time, Legislator Huang Shuying questioned whether as many as 100,000 contaminated ducks might already have entered the market.

== Suspected source of contamination ==
The suspected source of contamination in the Dioxin Duck Incident was illegally dumped furnace slag in the Dapingding area near the border between Kaohsiung City and Kaohsiung County. The Fengshan Reservoir is also located nearby, and adjacent pineapple fields and tilapia raised in duck ponds were believed to be contaminated as well.

Due to the remote location of the area, large quantities of waste materials generated from scrap metal smelting—including furnace slag, dust-collection ash, and aluminum slag—had been illegally discarded there. Scrap metal often contains plastic and paint residues, which, when melted at high temperatures without prior removal, can produce dioxins. Furnace slag refers to the residual material left after scrap metal is melted in electric arc furnaces, while dust-collection ash consists of particles captured from exhaust gases produced during the smelting process.

Officials from the Environmental Protection Administration noted that ducks have a habit of pecking at soil, which may have led them to ingest furnace slag and dust-collection ash contaminated with dioxins.

== Investigation ==
=== Tilapia ===
Testing showed that tilapia raised in the duck ponds did not exceed safety standards. However, to eliminate public concerns about contamination, the Environmental Protection Administration decided to destroy all the fish in the same manner as the contaminated ducks. The government purchased the fish from the operators at full price. The land of the contaminated duck farm was prohibited from further use, and discharge of water from the duck ponds was banned.

=== Slag dump sites ===
Following the incident, the Environmental Protection Administration inspected seven slag disposal sites within Kaohsiung City and Kaohsiung County. At an aluminum slag site on Xinzuo Road in Kaohsiung County and a disposal site on Shanbian Road in Kaohsiung City, levels of heavy metals such as copper and zinc exceeded safety limits. However, no excessive levels of dioxins were detected, and therefore the contamination source of the dioxin-affected ducks could not be conclusively linked to soil or waste materials at these sites.

=== Control Yuan censure ===
Approximately one year after the incident, in August 2010, the Control Yuan concluded that both the Environmental Protection Administration and the Industrial Development Bureau had failed to adequately regulate and monitor the recycling and reuse of furnace slag. As a result, corrective measures were issued against both agencies, and the Executive Yuan was requested to comprehensively review the regulatory system governing the reuse of slag-type waste in order to prevent improper reuse practices or illegal dumping in the future.The Kaohsiung City Environmental Protection Bureau stated that it would file an appeal, while the Kaohsiung County Environmental Protection Bureau asserted that it had already made substantial efforts in implementing culling and disposal measures and would improve its practices in response to the Control Yuan’s recommendations.

== Impact ==
As a result of the Dioxin Duck Incident, public willingness to consume duck meat declined. Businesses selling duck-related foods such as ginger duck hotpot and roast duck reported that despite cooler weather, revenues had dropped by 20 to 30 percent compared to previous years. Many vendors were questioned by consumers about the origin of their duck products and responded by prominently displaying proof of origin to reassure customers. The Ministry of Agriculture stated that if duck prices fell below production costs, measures would be taken to stabilize prices.

== Similar cases ==
In July 2014, Taiwan’s Food and Drug Administration under the Ministry of Health and Welfare found ducks in Fengshan District, Kaohsiung City, with dioxin levels exceeding safety standards. The case was determined to be a single, isolated incident. However, a professor from National Taiwan University criticized the authorities for their passive investigation and failure to promptly disclose details of the case.

In May 2018, illegal burial of furnace slag and other waste materials was discovered near a duck farm in the Dapingding area of Daliao District—the same location as the 2009 Dioxin Duck Incident.

== See also ==
- List of food contamination incidents
- Seveso disaster
