= Toxic equivalency factor =

Toxic equivalency factor (TEF) expresses the toxicity of dioxins, furans and PCBs in terms of the most toxic form of dioxin, 2,3,7,8-TCDD. The toxicity of the individual congeners may vary by orders of magnitude.

With the TEFs, the toxicity of a mixture of dioxins and dioxin-like compounds can be expressed in a single number – the toxic equivalency (TEQ). It is a single figure resulting from the product of the concentration and individual TEF values of each congener.

The TEF/TEQ concept has been developed to facilitate risk assessment and regulatory control. While the initial and current set of TEFs only apply to dioxins and dioxin-like chemicals (DLCs), the concept can theoretically be applied to any group of chemicals satisfying the extensive similarity criteria used with dioxins, primarily that the main mechanism of action is shared across the group. Thus far, only the DLCs have had such a high degree of evidence of toxicological similarity.

There have been several systems over the years in operation, such as the International Toxic Equivalents for dioxins and furans only, represented as I-TEQ_{DF}, as well as several country-specific TEFs. The present World Health Organization scheme, represented as WHO-TEQ_{DFP}, which includes PCBs is now universally accepted.

== Chemical mixtures and additivity ==
Humans and wildlife are rarely exposed to solitary contaminants, but rather to complex mixtures of potentially harmful compounds. Dioxins and DLCs are no exception. This is important to consider when assessing toxicity because the effects of chemicals in a mixture are often different from when acting alone. These differences can take place on the chemical level, where the properties of the compounds themselves change due to the interaction, creating a new dose at the target tissue and a quantitatively different effect. They may also act together (simple similar action) or independently on the organism at the receptor during uptake, when transported throughout the body, or during metabolism, to produce a joint effect. Joint effects are described as being additive (using dose, response/risk, or measured effect), synergistic, or antagonistic. A dose-additive response occurs when the mixture effect is determined by the sum of the component chemical doses, each weighted by its relative toxic potency. A risk-additive response occurs when the mixture response is the sum of component risks, based on the probability law of independent events. An effect-additive mixture response occurs when the combined effect of exposure a chemical mixture is equal to the sums of the separate component chemical effects, e.g., incremental changes in relative liver weight. Synergism occurs when the combined effect of chemicals together is greater than the additivity prediction based on their separate effects. Antagonism describes where the combined effect is less than the additive prediction. Clearly it is important to identify which kind of additivity is being used. These effects reflect the underlying modes of action and mechanisms of toxicity of the chemicals.

Additivity is an important concept here because the TEF method operates under the assumption that the assessed contaminants are dose-additive in mixtures. Because dioxins and DLCs act similarly at the AhR, their individual quantities in a mixture can be added together as proportional values, i.e. TEQs, to assess the total potency. This notion is fairly well supported by research. Some interactions have been observed and some uncertainties remain, including application to other than oral intake.

== TEF ==
Exposure to environmental media containing 2,3,7,8-TCDD and other dioxins and dioxin-like compounds can be harmful to humans as well as to wildlife. These chemicals are resistant to metabolism and biomagnify up the food chain. Toxic and biological effects of these compounds are mediated through the aryl hydrocarbon receptor (AhR). Oftentimes results of human activity leads to instances of these chemicals as mixtures of DLCs in the environment. The TEF approach has also been used to assess the toxicity of other chemicals including PAHs and xenoestrogens.

The TEF approach uses an underlying assumption of additivity associated with these chemicals that takes into account chemical structure and behavior. For each chemical the model uses comparative measures from individual toxicity assays, known as relative effect potency (REP), to assign a single scaling factor known as the TEF.

Toxic equivalency factor according to different schemes
Congener	BGA 1985	NATO (I-TEF) 1988	WHO 1998	WHO 2005	WHO 2022
2,3,7,8-Cl_{4}DD	1	1	1	1	1
1,2,3,7,8-Cl_{5}DD	0.1	0.5	1	1	0.4
2,3,7,8-subst. Cl_{6}DD	0.1	0.1	0.1	0.1	0.05, 0.07, 0.09
1,2,3,4,6,7,8-Cl_{7}DD	0.01	0.01	0.01	0.01	0.05
Cl_{8}DD	0.001	0.001	0.0001	0.0003	0.001
2,3,7,8-Cl_{4}DF	0.1	0.1	0.1	0.1	0.07
1,2,3,7,8-Cl_{5}DF	n.n.	0.05	0.05	0.03	0.01
2,3,4,7,8-Cl_{5}DF	0.01	0.5	0.5	0.3	0.1
2,3,7,8-subst. Cl_{6}DF	0.01	0.1	0.1	0.1	0.09, 0.1, 0.2, 0.3
2,3,7,8-subst. Cl_{7}DF	0.01	0.01	0.01	0.01	0.02, 0.1
other Cl_{7}DF	0.001	0	0	0	
Cl_{8}DF	0.001	0.001	0.0001	0.0003	0.002
other PCDD and PCDF	0.01	0	0	0	

=== TCDD ===
2,3,7,8-tetrachlorodibenzo-p-dioxin (TCDD) is the reference chemical to which the toxicity of other dioxins and DLCs are compared. TCDD is the most toxic DLC known. Other dioxins and DLCs are assigned a scaling factor, or TEF, in comparison to TCDD. TCDD has a TEF of 1.0. Sometimes PCB 126 is also used as a reference chemical, with a TEF of 0.1.

=== Determination of TEF ===
TEFs are determined using a database of REPs that meet WHO established criteria, using different biological models or endpoints and are considered estimates with an order of magnitude of uncertainty. The characteristics necessary for inclusion of a compound in the WHO's TEF approach include:

- Structural similarity to polychlorinated dibenzo-p-dioxins or polychlorinated dibenzofurans
- Capacity to bind to the aryl hydrocarbon receptor (AhR)
- Capacity to elicit AhR-mediated biochemical and toxic responses
- Persistence and accumulation in the food chain

All viable REPs for a chemical are compiled into a distribution, and the TEF is selected based on half order of magnitude increments on a logarithmic scale. The TEF is typically selected from the 75th percentile of the REP distribution in order to be protective of health.

=== In vivo and in vitro studies ===
REP distributions are not weighted to give more importance to certain types of studies. Current focus of REPs is on in vivo studies rather than in vitro. This is because all types of in vivo studies (acute, subchronic, etc.) and different endpoints have been combined, and associated REP distributions are shown as a single box plot.

== TEQ ==
Toxic Equivalents (TEQs) report the toxicity-weighted concentration of mixtures of PCDDs, PCDFs, and PCBs. The reported value provides toxicity information about the mixture of chemicals and is more meaningful to toxicologists than reporting the total concentration. To obtain TEQs, the concentration of each chemical in a mixture is multiplied by its TEF and is then summed with all other chemicals to report the total toxicity-weighted concentration. TEQs are then used for risk characterization and management purposes, such as prioritizing areas of cleanup.

=== Calculation ===
The toxic equivalency of a mixture is defined by the sum of the concentrations of individual compounds (C_{i}) multiplied by their relative toxicity (TEF):

TEQ = Σ[C_{i} × TEF_{i}]

== Applications ==
=== Risk assessment ===
Risk assessment is the process by which one estimates the probability of some adverse effect, such as that of a contaminant in the environment. Environmental risk assessments are conducted to help protect human health and the environment and are often used to assist in meeting regulations such as those stipulated by CERCLA in the United States. Risk assessments may take place retroactively, i.e., when assessing the contamination hazard at a superfund site, or predictively, such as when planning waste discharges.

The complex nature of chemicals mixtures in the environment presents a challenge to risk assessment. The TEF approach was developed to help assess the toxicity of DLCs and other environmental contaminants with additive effects and is currently endorsed by the World Health Organization

==== Human health ====
Human exposure to dioxins and DLCs is a cause for public and regulatory concern. Health concerns include endocrine, developmental, immune and carcinogenic effects. The route of exposure is primarily through the ingestion of animal products such as meat, dairy, fish, and human breast milk. However, humans are also exposed to high levels of "natural dioxins" in cooked foods and vegetables. The human diet accounts for over 95% of the total uptake of TEQ.

Risks in humans are typically calculated from known ingestion of contaminants or from blood or adipose tissue samples. However, human intake data is limited, and calculations from blood and tissue are not well supported. This presents a limitation to the TEF application in risk assessment to humans.

==== Fish and wildlife ====
DLC exposure to wildlife results from various sources including the atmospheric deposition of emissions (e.g. waste incineration) over terrestrial and aquatic habitats and contamination from waste effluents. Contaminants then bioaccumulate up the food chain. The WHO has derived TEFs for fish, bird, and mammal species, however differences among taxa for some compounds are orders of magnitude apart. Compared to mammals, fish are less responsive to mono-ortho PCBs.

=== Limitations ===
The TEF approach DLC risk assessment operates under certain assumptions which attach varying degrees of uncertainty. These assumptions include:

- Individual compounds all act through the same biologic pathway
- Individual effects are dose-additive
- Dose-response curves are similarly shaped
- Individual compounds are similarly distributed throughout the body

TEFs are assumed to be equivalent for all effects, all exposure scenarios and all species, although this may not be the reality. The TEF method only accounts for toxicity effects related to the AhR mechanism - however, some DLC toxicity may be mediated through other processes. Dose-additivity may not be applicable to all DLCs and exposure scenarios, particularly those involving low doses. Interactions with other chemicals that may induce antagonistic effects are not considered and those may be species-specific. In terms of human health risk assessments, estimates of relative potency from animal studies are assumed to be predictive of toxicity in humans, although there are species-specific differences in the AhR. Nevertheless, In vivo mixture studies have shown that WHO 1998 TEF values predicted mixture toxicity within a factor of two or less A probabilistic approach may provide an advantage in the determination of TEF because it will better describe the level of uncertainty present in a TEF value

The use of TEF values to assess abiotic matrices such as soil, sediment, and water is problematic because TEF values are primarily calculated from oral intake studies.

== History and development ==
Dating back to the 1980s there is a long history of developing TEFs and how to use them. New research being conducted influences guiding criteria for assigning TEFs as the science progresses. The World Health Organization has held expert panels to reach a global consensus on how to assign TEFs in conjunction with new data. Each individual country recommends their own TEF values, typically endorsing the WHO global consensus TEFs.

== Other compounds for potential inclusion ==
Based on mechanistic considerations, PCB 37, PBDDs, PBDFs, PXCDDs, PXCDFs, PCNs, PBNs and PBBs can be included in the TEF concept. However, most of these compounds lack human exposure data. Thus, TEF values for these compounds are in the process of review

== See also ==
- Dioxins and dioxin-like compounds

== Sources ==
- TRI Dioxin and Dioxin-like Compounds Toxic Equivalency Reporting Rule – Proposed Rule (US EPA) Archived at webcitation on 2 October 2012.
