= 2,3,7,8-Tetrachlorodibenzodioxin =

Polychlorinated dibenzo-p-dioxin, chemical compound

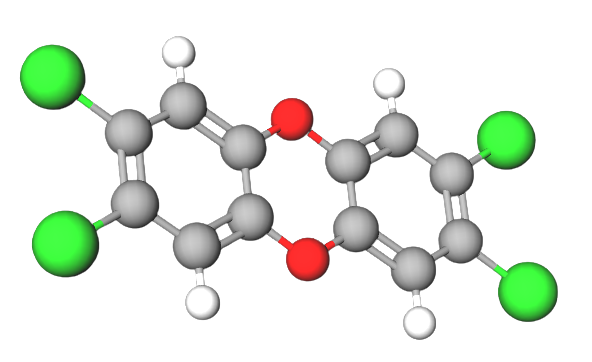

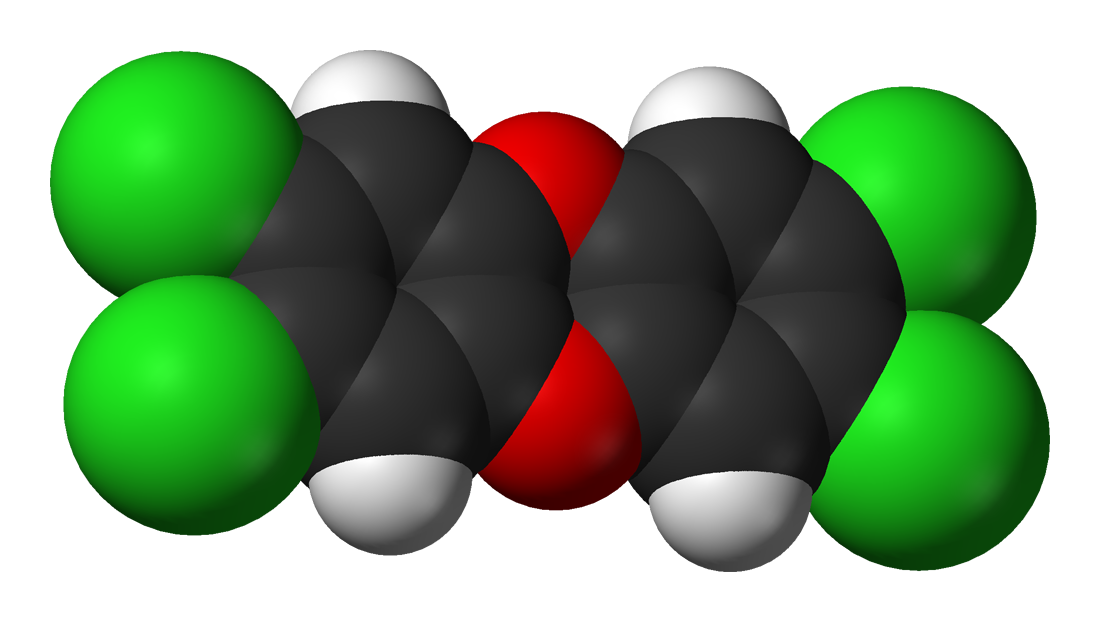

Names
- Preferred IUPAC name 2,3,7,8-Tetrachlorooxanthrene
- Other names 2,3,7,8-Tetrachlorodibenzo[b,e][1,4]dioxine; Tetradioxin; Tetrachlorodibenzodioxin; Tetrachlorodibenzo-p-dioxin

Identifiers
CAS Number	1746-01-6
3D model (JSmol)	Interactive image
Abbreviations	TCDD; TCDBD
ChEBI	CHEBI:28119
ChEMBL	ChEMBL30327
ChemSpider	14865
ECHA InfoCard	100.015.566
KEGG	C07557
PubChem CID	15625
UNII	DO80M48B6O
CompTox Dashboard (EPA)	DTXSID2021315
- InChI: InChI=1S/C12H4Cl4O2/c13-5-1-9-10(2-6(5)14)18-12-4-8(16)7(15)3-11(12)17-9/h1-4H Key: HGUFODBRKLSHSI-UHFFFAOYSA-N; InChI=1/C12H4Cl4O2/c13-5-1-9-10(2-6(5)14)18-12-4-8(16)7(15)3-11(12)17-9/h1-4H Key: HGUFODBRKLSHSI-UHFFFAOYAA
- SMILES: ClC1=C(Cl)C=C2OC(C=C(C(Cl)=C3)Cl)=C3OC2=C1

Properties
Chemical formula	C_{12}H_{4}Cl_{4}O_{2}
Molar mass	321.96 g·mol^{−1}
Appearance	Colorless to white crystalline solid
Density	1.8 g/cm^{3}
Melting point	305 °C (581 °F; 578 K)
Solubility in water	0.2 μg/L
log P	6.8
Vapor pressure	1.5 × 10^{−9} mmHg

Hazards
- Occupational safety and health (OHS/OSH)
Main hazards	Potent carcinogen and persistent organic pollutant.
- GHS labelling
Pictograms	(GHS02: Flammable) (GHS06: Toxic) (GHS08: Health hazard) (GHS09: Environmental hazard)
Signal word	Danger
Hazard statements	H225, H304, H315, H336, H361, H373, H401, H410
Precautionary statements	P201, P202, P210, P233, P240, P241, P242, P243, P260, P264, P271, P273, P280, P301+P310, P303+P361+P353, P304+P340+P312, P308+P313, P331, P332+P313, P362+P364, P370+P378, P391, P403+P233, P403+P235, P405, P501
NFPA 704 (fire diamond)	4 1 0
Flash point	164.2 °C (327.6 °F; 437.3 K)
- Lethal dose or concentration (LD, LC)
LD_{50} (median dose)	201 μg/kg (oral, rat); 120 μg/kg (intraperitoneal, mouse)
- NIOSH (US health exposure limits)
PEL (Permissible)	none
REL (Recommended)	Ca
IDLH (Immediate danger)	N.D.
Safety data sheet (SDS)	MSDS
- Except where otherwise noted, data are given for materials in their standard state (at 25 °C [77 °F], 100 kPa). verify (what is ?) Infobox references

2,3,7,8-Tetrachlorodibenzo-p-dioxin (TCDD) is a polychlorinated dibenzo-p-dioxin (sometimes shortened, though inaccurately, to simply dioxin) with the chemical formula C_{12}H_{4}Cl_{4}O_{2}. Pure TCDD is a colorless solid with no distinguishable odor at room temperature. It is usually formed as an unwanted product in burning processes of organic materials or as a side product in organic synthesis.

TCDD is the most potent compound (congener) of its series (polychlorinated dibenzodioxins, known as PCDDs or simply dioxins) and became known as a contaminant in Agent Orange, an herbicide used in the Vietnam War. TCDD was released into the environment in the Seveso disaster. It is a persistent organic pollutant.

== Biological activity in humans and animals ==
TCDD and dioxin-like compounds act via a specific receptor present in all cells: the aryl hydrocarbon (AH) receptor. This receptor is a transcription factor which is involved in the expression of genes; it has been shown that high doses of TCDD either increase or decrease the expression of several hundred genes in rats. These genes include the genes of enzymes responsible for the breakdown of foreign and often toxic compounds. Through the process of enzyme induction, TCDD increases the activation of enzymes responsible for breaking down carcinogenic polycyclic hydrocarbons such as benzo(a)pyrene.

These polycyclic hydrocarbons also activate the AH receptor, but less than TCDD and only temporarily. Even many natural compounds present in vegetables cause some activation of the AH receptor. This phenomenon can be viewed as adaptive and beneficial, because it protects the organism from toxic and carcinogenic substances. Excessive and persistent stimulation of AH receptor, however, leads to a multitude of adverse effects.

The physiological function of the AH receptor has been the subject of continuous research. One obvious function is to increase the activity of enzymes breaking down foreign chemicals or normal chemicals of the body as needed. There seem to be many other functions, however, related to the development of various organs and the immune systems or other regulatory functions. The AH receptor is phylogenetically highly conserved, with a history of at least 600 million years, and is found in all vertebrates. Its ancient analogs are important regulatory proteins even in more primitive species. In fact, knock-out animals with no AH receptor are prone to illness and developmental problems. Taken together, this implies the necessity of a basal degree of AH receptor activation to achieve normal physiological function.

== Toxicity in humans ==
In 2000, the Expert Group of the World Health Organization considered developmental toxicity as the most pertinent risk of dioxins to human beings. Because people are usually exposed simultaneously to several dioxin-like chemicals, a more detailed account is given at dioxins and dioxin-like compounds.

=== Developmental effects ===
In Vietnam and the United States, teratogenic or birth defects were observed in children of people who were exposed to Agent Orange or 2,4,5-T that contained TCDD as an impurity out of the production process. However, there has been some uncertainty on the causal link between Agent Orange/dioxin exposure. In 2006, a meta-analysis indicated large amount of heterogeneity between studies and emphasized a lack of consensus on the issue. Stillbirths, cleft palate, and neural tube defects, with spina bifida were the most statistically significant defects. Later some tooth defects and borderline neurodevelopmental effects have been reported. After the Seveso accident, tooth development defects, changed sex ratio and decreased sperm quality have been noted. Various developmental effects have been clearly shown after high mixed exposures to dioxins and dioxin-like compounds, the most dramatic in Yusho and Yu-chen catastrophes, in Japan and Taiwan, respectively.

=== Cancer ===
It is largely agreed that TCDD is not directly mutagenic or genotoxic. Its main action is cancer promotion; it promotes the carcinogenicity initiated by other compounds. Very high doses may, in addition, cause cancer indirectly; one of the proposed mechanisms is oxidative stress and the subsequent oxygen damage to DNA. There are other explanations such as endocrine disruption or altered signal transduction. The endocrine disrupting activities seem to be dependent on life stage, being anti-estrogenic when estrogen is present (or in high concentration) in the body, and estrogenic in the absence of estrogen.

TCDD was classified by the International Agency for Research on Cancer (IARC) as a carcinogen for humans (group 1). In the occupational cohort studies available for the classification, the risk was weak and borderline detectable, even at very high exposures. Therefore, the classification was, in essence, based on animal experiments and mechanistic considerations. This was criticized as a deviation from IARC's 1997 classification rules. The main problem with IARC classification is that it only assesses qualitative hazard, i.e. carcinogenicity at any dose, and not the quantitative risk at different doses. According to a 2006 Molecular Nutrition & Food Research article, there were debates on whether TCDD was carcinogenic only at high doses which also cause toxic damage of tissues. A 2011 review concluded that, after 1997, further studies did not support an association between TCDD exposure and cancer risk. One of the problems is that in all occupational studies the subjects have been exposed to a large number of chemicals, not only TCDD. By 2011, it was reported that studies that include the update of Vietnam veteran studies from Operation Ranch Hand, had concluded that after 30 years the results did not provide evidence of disease. On the other hand, the latest studies on Seveso population support TCDD carcinogenicity at high doses.

In 2004, an article in the International Journal of Cancer provided some direct epidemiological evidence that TCDD or other dioxins are not causing soft-tissue sarcoma at low doses, although this cancer has been considered typical for dioxins. There was in fact a trend of cancer to decrease. This is called a J-shape dose-response, low doses decrease the risk, and only higher doses increase the risk, according to a 2005 article in the journal Dose-Response.

=== Safety recommendations ===
The Joint FAO/WHO Expert Committee on Food Additives (JECFA) derived in 2001 a provisional tolerable monthly intake (PTMI) of 70 pg TEQ/kg body weight. The United States Environmental Protection Agency (EPA) established an oral reference dose (RfD) of 0.7 pg/kg b.w. per day for TCDD (see discussion on the differences in).

According to the Aspen Institute, in 2011:

The general environmental limit in most countries is 1,000 ppt TEq in soils and 100 ppt in sediment. Most industrialized countries have dioxin concentrations in soils of less than 12 ppt. The U.S. Agency for Toxic Substance and Disease Registry has determined that levels higher than 1,000 ppt TEq in soil require intervention, including research, surveillance, health studies, community and physician education, and exposure investigation. The EPA is considering reducing these limits to 72 ppt TEq. This change would significantly increase the potential volume of contaminated soil requiring treatment.

== Animal toxicology ==
By far most information on toxicity of dioxin-like chemicals is based on animal studies utilizing TCDD. Almost all organs are affected by high doses of TCDD. In short-term toxicity studies in animals, the typical effects are anorexia and wasting, and even after a huge dose animals die only 1 to 6 weeks after the TCDD administration. Seemingly similar species have varying sensitivities to acute effects: lethal dose for a guinea pig is about 1 μg/kg, but to a hamster it is more than 1,000 μg/kg. A similar difference can be seen even between two different rat strains. Various hyperplastic (overgrowth) or atrophic (wasting away) responses are seen in different organs, thymus atrophy is very typical in several animal species. TCDD also affects the balance of several hormones. In some species, but not in all, severe liver toxicity is seen. Taking into account the low doses of dioxins in the present human population, only two types of toxic effects have been considered to cause a relevant risk to humans: developmental effects and cancer.

=== Developmental effects ===
Developmental effects occur at very low doses in animals. They include frank teratogenicity such as cleft palate and hydronephrosis. Development of some organs may be even more sensitive: very low doses perturb the development of sexual organs in rodents, and the development of teeth in rats. The latter is important in that tooth deformities were also seen after the Seveso accident and possibly after a long breast-feeding of babies in the 1970s and 1980s when the dioxin concentrations in Europe were about ten times higher than at present.

=== Cancer ===
Cancers can be induced in animals at many sites. At sufficiently high doses, TCDD has caused cancer in all animals tested. The most sensitive is liver cancer in female rats, and this has long been a basis for risk assessment. Dose-response of TCDD in causing cancer does not seem to be linear, and there is a threshold below which it seems to cause no cancer. TCDD is not mutagenic or genotoxic, in other words, it is not able to initiate cancer, and the cancer risk is based on promotion of cancer initiated by other compounds or on indirect effects such as disturbing defense mechanisms of the body e.g. by preventing apoptosis or programmed death of altered cells. Carcinogenicity is associated with tissue damage, and it is often viewed as secondary to tissue damage.

TCDD may in some conditions potentiate the carcinogenic effects of other compounds. An example is benzo(a)pyrene that is metabolized in two steps, oxidation and conjugation. Oxidation produces epoxide carcinogens that are rapidly detoxified by conjugation, but some molecules may escape to the nucleus of the cell and bind to DNA causing a mutation, resulting in cancer initiation. When TCDD increases the activity of oxidative enzymes more than conjugation enzymes, the epoxide intermediates may increase, increasing the possibility of cancer initiation. Thus, a beneficial activation of detoxifying enzymes may lead to deleterious side effects.

== Sources ==
TCDD has never been produced commercially except as a pure chemical for scientific research. It is, however, formed as a synthesis side product when producing certain chlorophenols or chlorophenoxy acid herbicides. It may also be formed along with other polychlorinated dibenzodioxins and dibenzofuranes in any burning of hydrocarbons where chlorine is present, especially if certain metal catalysts such as copper are also present. Usually a mixture of dioxin-like compounds is produced, therefore a more thorough treatise is under dioxins and dioxin-like compounds.

The greatest production occurs from waste incineration, metal production, and fossil-fuel and wood combustion. Dioxin production can usually be reduced by increasing the combustion temperature. Total U.S. emissions of PCCD/Fs were reduced from ca. 14 kg TEq in 1987 to 1.4 kg TEq in 2000.

== History ==
TCDD was first synthesized in the laboratory in 1957 by Wilhelm Sandermann, and he also discovered the effects of the compound.

=== Cases of exposure ===
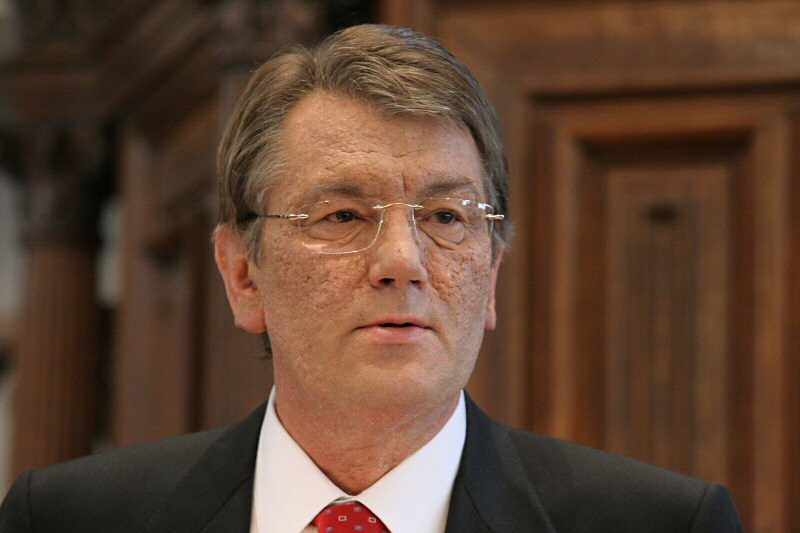
A photograph of Viktor Yushchenko after he was poisoned with TCDD. TCDD often causes disfiguring skin thickening and pitting.

There have been numerous incidents where people have been exposed to high doses of TCDD.

- In 1953, a thermal runaway accident occurred at BASF during the chlorination of diphenyl oxide, as a result of which several workers developed severe chloracne. Similar cases had occurred 6 years earlier in the US and in 1952, 1954 and 1956 at the Boehringer Ingelheim company.
- In 1976, thousands of inhabitants of Seveso, Italy were exposed to TCDD after an accidental release of several kilograms of TCDD from a pressure tank. Many animals died, and high concentrations of TCDD, up to 56 ng/g of fat, were noted especially in children playing outside and eating local food. The acute effects were limited to about 200 cases of chloracne. Long-term effects seem to include a slight excess of multiple myeloma and myeloid leukaemia, as well as some developmental effects such as disturbed development of teeth and excess of girls born to fathers who were exposed as children. Several other long-term effects have been suspected, but the evidence is not very strong.
- In Times Beach, Missouri, several hundred people were poisoned by extremely high concentrations of TCDD by Russell Martin Bliss, who sprayed TCDD-contaminated waste oil on dusty roads to avoid large dust clouds. Bliss himself obtained the waste oil from NEPACCO, a company that produced defoliants and bactericides. No one was ever charged in relation to the incident, and the city of Times Beach was abandoned and disincorporated following an investigation by the CDC and EPA. This is marked as the single largest contamination of a civilian area by TCDD in United States history.
- In Vienna, two women were poisoned at their workplace in 1997, and the measured concentrations in one of them were the highest ever measured in a human being, 144 ng/g of fat. This is about 100,000 times the concentrations in most people and about 10,000 times the sum of all dioxin-like compounds in young people. They survived but suffered from difficult chloracne for several years. The poisoning likely happened in October 1997 but was not discovered until April 1998. At the institute where the women worked as secretaries, high concentrations of TCDD were found in one of the labs, suggesting that the compound had been produced there. The police investigation failed to find clear evidence of crime, and no one was ever prosecuted. Aside from malaise and amenorrhea there were few other symptoms or abnormal laboratory findings.
- In 2004, presidential candidate Viktor Yushchenko of Ukraine was poisoned with a large dose of TCDD. His blood TCDD concentration was measured 108 ng/g of fat, which is the second highest ever measured. This concentration implies a dose exceeding 2 mg, or 25 μg/kg of body weight. He suffered from chloracne for many years, but after initial malaise, other symptoms or abnormal laboratory findings were few.
- An area of polluted land in Italy, known as the Triangle of Death, is contaminated with TCDD from years of illegal waste disposal by organized crime.

== See also ==
- Toxic equivalency
