= Burn pit =

U.S. military base waste disposal area

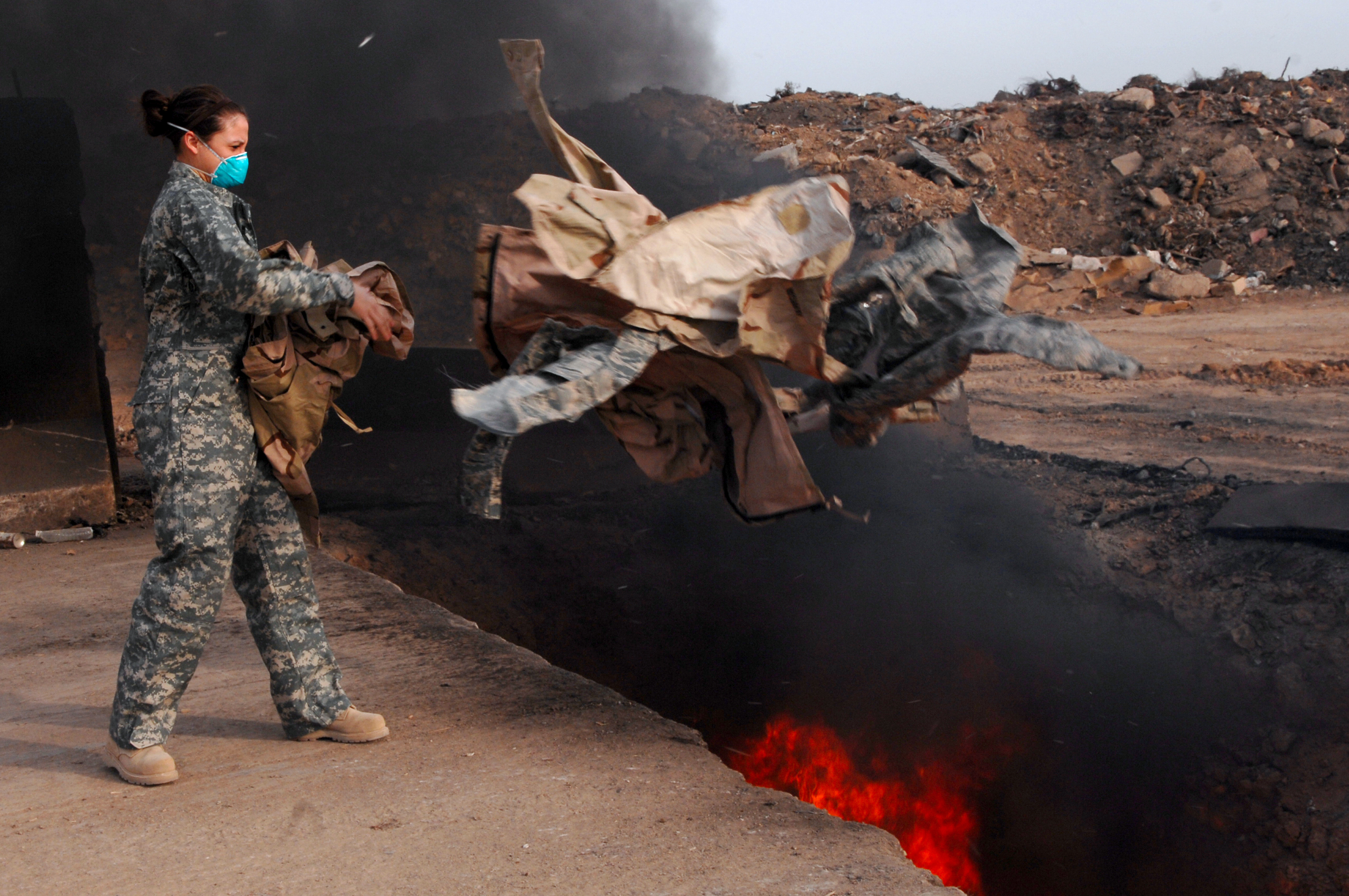
Service member disposing of uniforms. Military uniforms must be burned to ensure they cannot be worn by enemy forces who do not obey the Hague Conventions of 1899 and 1907.

A burn pit is an area of a United States military base in which waste is disposed of by burning.

According to the United States Army field manual, there are four other ways outside of burn pits to dispose of nonhazardous solid waste: incinerators, burial, landfills, and tactical burial. Open-air burning is a way to dispose of waste, but increases risk of fire and produces noxious fumes. Due to modern waste in deployed environments, there is plastic (including water bottles), shipping materials, electronic waste, and other material that may emit toxic aerial compounds. Burn pits were heavily criticized and resulted in lawsuits by military veterans, Department of Defense civilians, and military contractors. Global environmental consciousness has especially criticized these instances of large-scale burn pit operation. The effects of burn pits seem to be similar to that of fire debris cleanup.

The Department of Defense estimates that 3.5 million service members were exposed to burn pits. The Department of Veterans Affairs has granted about 73% of veterans' burn pit claims related to asthma, sinusitis and rhinitis.

== Use in Iraq and Afghanistan ==
During the Gulf War (1990–1991) and continuing through the Iraq and Afghanistan wars, military bases throughout the region used burn pits as a way to dispose of waste. These locations included Iraq, Afghanistan, Kuwait, Saudi Arabia, Bahrain, Djibouti, Diego Garcia, Gulf of Aden, Gulf of Oman, Oman, Qatar, United Arab Emirates, Persian Gulf, Arabian Sea, and Red Sea. In 2010, large-scale burn pit operations in Iraq and Afghanistan, allegedly operated by the U.S. military or its contractors such as KBR, were reported to have allowed the operation of the burn pits for long periods, burning many tons of assorted waste. Active duty personnel reported respiratory difficulties and headaches in some cases, while some veterans made disability claims based on respiratory system symptoms allegedly derived from the burn pits. General David Petraeus, commander, US Central Command and Multi-National Force-Iraq, stated commanders' concerns were about basic needs (food and water) of the soldiers under his command and not burn pits, at the time. The Special Inspector General for Afghanistan Reconstruction found burn pits to be indefensible because their emissions are potentially harmful to US servicemembers.

=== Examples ===
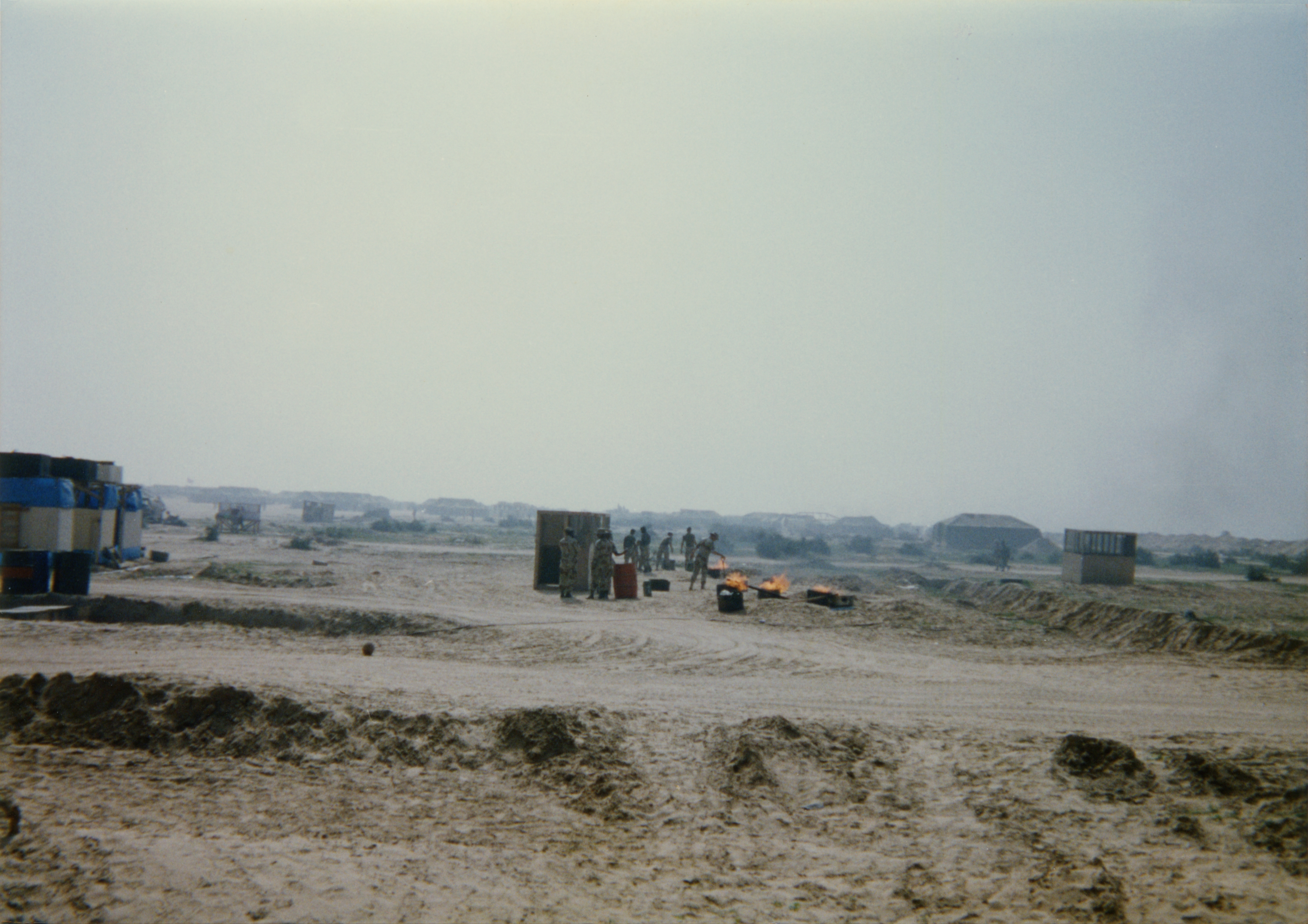
Waste burning in the 1st Marine Division support area in Saudi Arabia during the Gulf War in 1991

Joint Base Balad (JBB), the largest U.S. base in Iraq had a burn pit operation as late as the summer of 2008, burning 147 tons of waste per day when the Army Times published a major story about it and related health concerns. The burn pit at JBB was 10-acres and the waste produced by each person assigned to JBB is estimated to be between 3.6 and 4.5 kilograms (7.9 and 9.9 lb) of waste per day. An Air Force spokesman speaking for the 609th Combined Air and Space Operations Center Southwest Asia vigorously contested allegations of health effects and emphasized mitigation efforts. In Afghanistan, at its peak, more than 400 tons of waste was disposed using burn pits daily.

According to Leon Russell Keith, a military contractor stationed at Balad who testified at a Senate hearing in 2009, ash was everywhere, including on beds and clothes. He described that the thick black smoke was present even in the barracks, where it permanently stained sheets. One soldier described the smoke as "like San Francisco fog". Another called it "pollen dust". The color of the smoke could be blue and black, or yellow and orange, but was usually black.

=== Duration ===
Burn pits were allegedly adopted as a temporary measure but remained in use several years after alternative methods of disposal such as incineration were available. Burn pits were used during Operation Desert Shield and Desert Storm. As of July 2019, there were still nine sanctioned burn pits in operation in Syria, Afghanistan, and Egypt. Per the DoD, this is a last resort when no feasible alternative exists. For longer-term enduring locations, conventional solid waste practices are used.

== Use in the United States ==
Hazardous materials are burned in open piles at military installations in the United States, including the Radford Army Ammunition Plant in Virginia.

== Materials burned and combustion products ==
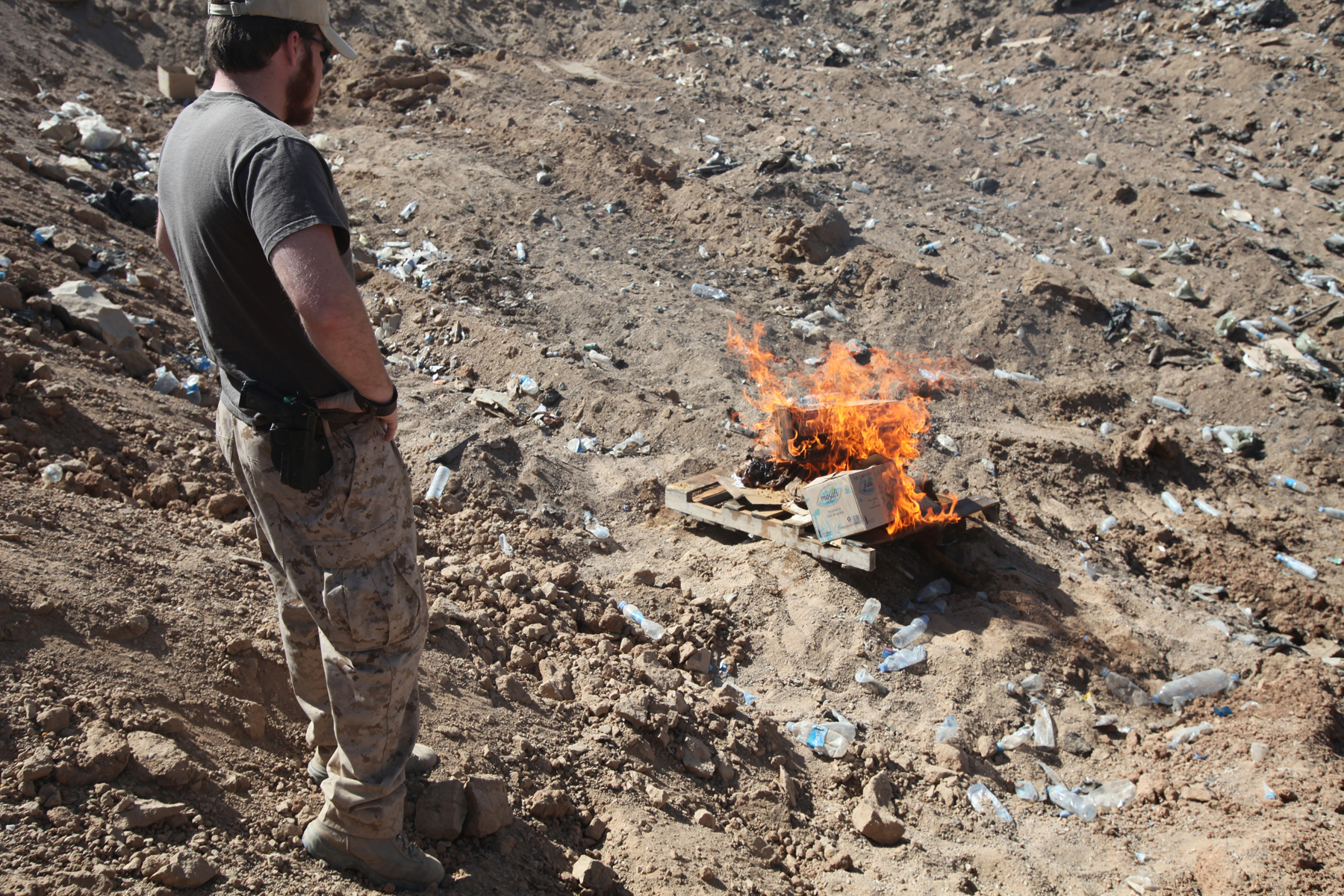
A Drug Enforcement Administration team member destroying opium and drug-making chemicals at a burn pit at a forward operating base in Marjah, Afghanistan

The waste burned using burn pits included chemicals, paints, medical waste, human waste, metal and aluminum products, electronic waste, munitions (including unexploded ordnance), petroleum products, lubricants, plastics, rubber, wood, and food waste. A typical burn pit uses jet fuel (usually JP-8) as the accelerant. The burning of such material creates clouds of black smoke.

The Air Force notes the following risks of open pit burning:

Burning solid wastes in an open pit generates numerous pollutants. These pollutants include dioxins, particulate matter, polycyclic aromatic hydrocarbons, volatile organic compounds, carbon monoxide, hexachlorobenzene, and ash. Highly toxic dioxins, produced in small amounts in almost all burning processes, can be produced in elevated levels with increased combustion of plastic waste (such as discarded drinking water bottles) and if the combustion is not at high incinerator temperatures. Inefficient combustion of medical or latrine wastes can emit disease-laden aerosols.

Dioxin is the same chemical found in Agent Orange used in the Vietnam War. Additionally, burn pits also created particulate matter (PM) 2.5 and PM 10 pollution. Below is a table that has all of the known pollutants that have been detected in burn pits.

| 1,2,3,4,7,8-HexaCDD | acenaphthylene (ACY) | chrysene (CHR) |
| 1,2,3,7,8,9-HexaCDD | anthracene (ANT) | dibenz[a,h]anthracene (DBahA) |
| 1,2,3,7,8-PentaCDD | benz[a]anthracene (BaA) | fluoranthene (FLT) |
| 10 furans | benzo[a]pyrene (BaP) | fluorene (FLU) |
| 17 PAHs | benzo[b]fluoranthene (BbF) | indeno[1,2,3-cd]pyrene (IP) |
| 2,3,7,8-TetraCDD | benzo[e]pyrene (BeP) | Naphthalene |
| 7 dioxins, 1,2,3,4,6,7,8-HeptaCDD | benzo[ghi]perylene (BghiP) | OctaCDD |
| acenaphthene (ACE) | benzo[k]fluoranthene (BkF), | pyrene (PYR) |

== Health effects ==
In 2009, growing concerns regarding the health effects of burn pits led President Barack Obama to direct federal agencies to consult recent scientific findings regarding burn pits to protect US military personnel, and for military commanders to implement recommendations to protect those under their command. Anthony Szema, MD of Stony Brook School of Medicine stated that humans exposed to air pollution, especially particulate matter (PM), have high risk of death and lung disease (e.g., chronic obstructive pulmonary disease). Benzene (a component of JP-8) is a known carcinogen and was a commonly used accelerant for burn pits. Burn pits operate at lower temperatures which causes more incomplete combustion, which results in greater amounts of aerosolized toxic by-products.

In November 2009, the Veteran's Administration (VA) and the National Academy of Sciences Institute of Medicine (IOM) began an 18-month study to determine the long-term health effects of exposure to the burn pits in Iraq and Afghanistan. The VA and the Department of Defense (DoD), the Board on the Health of Select Populations of the Institute of Medicine formed the Committee on Long-term Health Consequences of Exposure to Burn Pits in Iraq and Afghanistan which held its first meeting on February 23, 2010, in Washington, D.C. In 2011, the Institute of Medicine reviewed the scientific literature related to the possibility of adverse long-term health effects of open burn pits. The report, Long-Term Health Consequences of Exposure to Burn Pits in Iraq and Afghanistan, noted U.S. Department of Defense air quality monitoring data measured levels of particulate matter (PM) higher than generally considered safe by U.S. regulatory agencies. It also cited work linking high PM levels to cardiopulmonary effects, particularly in individuals at increased risk due to pre-existing conditions such as asthma and emphysema. They concluded that there is only limited evidence suggestive "of an association between exposure to combustion products and reduced pulmonary function in these populations".

There has been research in the following areas to determine exposure to burn pit and health effects:

- Reproductive health outcomes: There is some research to suggest that toxins from burn pits can have adverse birth outcomes (low birth weight, preterm delivery, and increased risk of birth defects). Additionally, there is growing evidence to suggest a reduction in sperm quality associated with burn pits.
- Autoimmune disorders: A study found no elevated occurrence of rheumatoid arthritis and lupus among veterans deployed within 3 miles of burn pits.
- Cancers: One veteran believed her fatal pancreatic cancer was caused by burn pit exposure. Joe Biden believes that exposure contributed to his son Beau Biden's brain cancer. Other veterans were concerned that exposure contributed to illnesses including cancer, but many were denied compensation claims due to a "lack of evidence establishing a connection to military service." More recently, the USDVA has listed several forms of cancer as presumptive conditions for burn pit exposure. One study using Burn Pits 360's registry found that there is a higher rate of proportionate cancer mortality among deceased veterans.
- High blood pressure: A study from the Veterans Affairs Airborne Hazards and Open Burn Pit Registry found that one-third of those exposed to burn pits were diagnosed with high blood pressure.
- Respiratory disorders: The Veterans Affairs Airborne Hazards and Open Burn Pit Registry shows that 30% of participatants have been diagnosed with chronic obstructive pulmonary disease, emphysema, and chronic bronchitis.
- Mood disorders, mental health problems and brain damage: In 2025, The National Institutes of Health released a joint study in collaboration with the DOD and Veterans Affairs. It went over the health information of nearly 440,000 veterans stationed in Iraq and Afghanistan between 2001 and 2011. They found higher rates of mood disorders (such as depression), mental health problems, intracranial injuries, and traumatic brain damage in personnel deployed near burn pits.

According to the Army, proper waste management practices have reduced the spread of infectious diseases that contributed significantly to mortality and morbidity in military populations.

=== Veterans Affairs Registry ===
The Veterans Affairs Airborne Hazards and Open Burn Pit Registry was established in 2014 to gather information about veterans and service members collected through a question regarding exposure to burn pits air. Service members who participated in Operation Enduring Freedom, Operation Iraqi Freedom, Operation New Dawn, or the 1990-1991 Gulf War can use the registry questionnaire to report exposures to airborne hazards (such as smoke from burn pits, oil-well fires, or pollution during deployment), as well as other exposures and health concerns.

Reports on the registry data:

1. Report on Data from the Airborne Hazards and Open Burn Pit (AH&OBP) Registry, June 2015 - Between April 25, 2014, and December 31, 2014, nearly thirty thousand Veterans and Active Duty Servicemembers filled out the registry survey. This report highlights health conditions and physical limitations experienced by burn pit registry participants.

- The most common doctor-diagnosed health problems reported were insomnia and neurological problems.
- Other commonly diagnosed health problems reported include allergies, high blood pressure, and lung disease like emphysema, chronic bronchitis, and asthma.
- It is important to remember that Registry findings alone can't tell if exposure to burn pits, dust storms, or other hazards caused these health conditions.

2. Report on Data from the Airborne Hazards and Open Burn Pit (AH&OBP) Registry, April 2015

As of December 31, 2019, 186,051 veterans and active duty members had completed the questionnaire since June 2014.

=== Proposed health tracking ===
US Army veteran and University of Pennsylvania graduate student Chad Baer has vocally asserted that claims of inclusive results are due to faulty research design. Baer was selected as a SVA/VFW Legislative Fellow in 2019, and traveled to Capitol Hill to advocate for a predictive analytics model. Baer has asserted that technological advances have made longitudinal studies of all veterans feasible, except that this is not possible so long as the Department of Defense refuses to give VA researchers more complete data. The data in question would be the personnel data that would allow the VA to establish "clusters", based on items such as physical location, job specialties, or other relevant data points.

== Legislative response ==
Congressional action taken includes:

- 2009 – HR 2419, Military Personnel War Zone Toxic Exposure Prevention Act
- 2013 – President Obama signed the National Burn Pit Registry into law as part of the Dignified Burial and Veterans' Benefit Improvement Act of 2012.
- 2018 – President Trump signed the Helping Vets Exposed to Burn Pits Act.
- 2022 – President Biden signed the Promise to Address Comprehensive Toxics (PACT) Act

A Minnesota mother, Amie Muller, was a victim of the exposure and her senator, Amy Klobuchar (MN-DFL), carried a bill called the Helping Vets Exposed to Burn Pits Act that was passed and signed into law by President Donald Trump (as H.R. 5895) on September 21, 2018. Through 2019, it provided $5 million for burn pit research, education and evaluation of the exposure of other U.S. service members and veterans to burn pits and toxic airborne chemicals.

== See also ==
- Waste Incineration Directive
