= Heptachlorodibenzo-p-dioxin =

Names
- Preferred IUPAC name 1,2,3,4,6,7,8-Heptachlorooxanthrene
- Other names: 1,2,3,4,6,7,8-Heptachlorodibenzo-para-dioxin; 1,2,3,4,6,7,8-HpCDD

Identifiers
CAS Number	35822-46-9
3D model (JSmol)	Interactive image
ChEBI	CHEBI:81505
ChemSpider	34207
ECHA InfoCard	100.223.051
EC Number	694-835-3
KEGG	C18103
PubChem CID	37270
UNII	MM6333103R
UN number	2811
CompTox Dashboard (EPA)	DTXSID1052034
- InChI: InChI=1S/C12HCl7O2/c13-2-1-3-10(7(17)4(2)14)21-12-9(19)6(16)5(15)8(18)11(12)20-3/h1H Key: WCLNVRQZUKYVAI-UHFFFAOYSA-N
- SMILES: C1=C2C(=C(C(=C1Cl)Cl)Cl)OC3=C(O2)C(=C(C(=C3Cl)Cl)Cl)Cl

Properties
Chemical formula	C_{12}HCl_{7}O_{2}
Molar mass	425.29 g·mol^{−1}
Appearance	Off-white powder
Solubility in water	1.9 × 10^{−3} mg/L

Hazards
- GHS labelling
Pictograms	(GHS07: Exclamation mark) (GHS08: Health hazard) (GHS09: Environmental hazard)
Signal word	Danger
Hazard statements	H319, H335, H341, H410
Precautionary statements	P201, P202, P261, P264, P271, P273, P280, P281, P304+P340, P305+P351+P338, P308+P313, P312, P337+P313, P391, P403+P233, P405, P501
- Except where otherwise noted, data are given for materials in their standard state (at 25 °C [77 °F], 100 kPa). Infobox references

1,2,3,4,6,7,8-Heptachlorodibenzo-para-dioxin (often referred to as 1,2,3,4,6,7,8-HpCDD) is a polychlorinated derivative of dibenzo-p-dioxin and can therefore be categorized as a polychlorinated dibenzo-p-dioxin (PCDD), a subclass of dioxins which includes 75 congeners. HpCDD is the dibenzo-p-dioxin which is chlorinated at positions 1, 2, 3, 4, 6, 7, and 8. It is a polycyclic heterocyclic organic compound, since HpCDD contains multiple cyclic structures (two benzene rings connected by a 1,4-dioxin ring) in which two different elements (carbon and oxygen) are members of its rings. HpCDD has molecular formula C_{12}HCl_{7}O_{2} and is an off-white powder, which is insoluble in water.

== History ==
Dioxins are mostly by-products of industrial processes such as the manufacturing of pesticides, bleaching of paper pulp, or combustion processes such as waste incineration. This means that heptachlorodibenzo-p-dioxin does not have a common use. In 1998, Professor Sharon Beder argued that large companies have tried to play down the seriousness of the toxic problems of dioxin. She described her concern in her paper ‘The Dioxin Controversy: Spilling over into Schools’. Companies responded by stating that Beder’s paper was based on ‘fear and emotion’ and not on science.

== Metabolism ==
The halflife of heptachlorodibenzo-p-dioxin is calculated to be 3.6 years. This estimation was based on the analysis of fat tissue biopsies collected with an interval of 28 months from on 14-year-old girl who for a period of about 2–3 years had been exposed to technical pentachlorophenol. The half-lives of Hexachlorodibenzo-p-dioxin and octachlorodibenzo-p-dioxin were estimated to be 3.5 and 2 years, respectively.

The effects of chlorodibenzo-p-dioxin exposure was examined in rats over a 13-week period. Hepatic accumulation was associated with alterations of several biochemical parameters. The following alterations were discovered: ethoxyresorufin-O-deethylase activity was elevated 40-fold over controls; total cytochrome P450 content doubled and exhibited a 2 nanometer blue shift in the Soret maximum for the reduced hemoprotein-CO complex. Cytochrome P450c and cytochrome P450d were significantly increased, while cytochrome P450b levels were unaltered. Nearly all the dioxincongeners present in liver were represented by octachlorodibenzo-p-dioxin, with a slight amount of heptachlorinated-p-dioxin.

== Mechanism of action ==
Dioxins in general are able to bind to the aryl hydrocarbon receptor (AH receptor). This cell protein initiates effects of most of dioxin-like chemicals. The exact function of the protein of the cell is unknown, but the protein plays a role in rhythmic functions and organ development.

When a dioxin enters the cell and binds to the AH receptor, a complex is formed with another protein, ARNKT. This heterodimer (which is in fact a transcription factor) binds to the DNA. The complex can inhibit or activate unknown genes.

== Toxicity ==
Chloracne, an acne-like eruption of blackheads, cysts, and pustules, is associated with exposure to pentachlorophenol contaminated with heptachlorodibenzo-p-dioxin. This association was first made when individuals employed in the manufacturing of pentachlorophenol were examined. It was discovered that direct contact with the pentachlorophenol lead to significantly increased risk of cloracne. More human studies on the toxicity of heptachlorodibenzo-p-dioxin are not available. However, animal studies showed non-human toxicity levels: LD_{50} rabbit, oral > 5000 mg/kg, LD_{50} rat, oral > 5000 mg/kg, and LD_{50} guinea pig, oral > 600 ug/kg.

Heptachlorodibenzo-p-dioxin is not classifiable as to its carcinogenicity to humans.

The abiothic degradation of heptachlorodibenzo-p-dioxin has been estimated. The rate constant for the vapor phase reaction of heptachlorodibenzo-p-dioxin with photochemically produced hydroxyl radicals has been estimated to be 1.3 × 10^{−12} cu cm/molecule-sec at 25 °C which corresponds to an atmospheric half-life of 12.3 days at an atmospheric concentration of 5 × 10^{5} hydroxyl radicals per cu cm.

== Adverse effects ==
The known adverse effects for dioxin compounds are (as previously mentioned) carcinogenicity. Furthermore, chloroacne, disturbances in tooth development and other developmental effects at high concentration are known adverse effects of HpCDD. There is a very wide range of health effects because the mechanism can have all sorts of implications on the genome (see mechanism of action). HpCDD is known to cause lung cancer and anemia in rats. However, there are not many studies on humans that assess the health risk factors of HpCDD. HpCDD seems to be more potent once it is circulating the body in comparison with other PCDDs, making it more toxic than other PCDDs. This probably has to do with the high substitution of chloro groups.

Dioxins in general are hard to break down efficiently. This causes bioaccumulation and environmental persistence.

== Effects on animals ==
=== Immunotoxicity ===
HpCDD is known to suppress the antibody response of C57B1/6 mice to sheep erythrocytes, a macrophage and T-cell-dependent antigen. In vivo approaches have been applied to characterize the sensitivity of suppression of the antibody response of C57B1/6 mice by an acute oral exposure to HpCDD. Suppression of the antibody response was observed after HpCDD administration at various times prior to or following antigen challenge.

=== Carcinogenicity ===
HpCDD is indicated as a potent liver tumor promotor in female (and only female) rats. In primary cultures of hepatocytes of female rats, co-mitogenic actions of HpCDD and congeners are mediated by the aryl-hydrocarbon (AH) receptor. These actions are enhanced by estrogens. HpCDD alone is relatively ineffective in the promotion of tumors in female rats livers, but when DNA-synthesis is stimulated by epidermal growth factor, HpCDD acts as a co-mitogen. These effects are observed for different congeners of polychlorinated dibenzo-p-dioxins, based on their affinity with the aryl-hydrocarbon receptor.
