= BEQ =

BEQ is an abbreviation for:

- Bachelor Enlisted Quarters, which are buildings on U.S. Military bases for quartering enlisted personnel (as opposed to BOQ (Bachelor Officer Quarters) used by unmarried commissioned officers.
- Brendan Emmett Quigley, an American crossword puzzle constructor
- Business Ethics Quarterly, a scholarly journal sponsored by the Society for Business Ethics
- The IATA code for RAF Honington
- Bioanalytical equivalent, a measure of potency estimates in cell bioassays
- beq, branch if equal, an RISC-V instruction
- Belur railway station (station code: BEQ), West Bengal, India
