= Environmental Principles and Policies =

2006 book by Sharon Beder

- Author: Sharon Beder
- Publication date: 2006
- Pages: 304 pp.
- ISBN: 978-1-84407-404-4
- OCLC: 70232360

Environmental Principles and Policies: An Interdisciplinary Introduction is a textbook written by Professor Sharon Beder. The book examines six environmental and social principles that have been used at the international and national level. It uses them to evaluate the new wave of market-based policy instruments that have been introduced in many countries.

== Six principles ==
The six principles discussed in the book are::

- the sustainability principle
- the polluter pays principle
- the precautionary principle
- the equity principle
- the human rights principles
- the participation principle

== The author ==
Professor Beder was included in a list of "Australia's most influential engineers", published by Engineers Australia in 2004. She was also included in Bulletin Magazine's "Smart 100" in 2003.

== Reception ==
The book was reviewed in Pacific Conservation Biology,, the Australian Journal of Environmental Education, Environment and History, and the International Journal of Innovation and Sustainable Development.

== See also ==
- Sustainable development
- Environmental policy
- List of Australian environmental books
