= Tolerable daily intake =

Amount of a chemical contaminant that is safe

Tolerable daily intake (TDI) refers to the daily amount of a chemical contaminant that has been assessed safe for human exposure on long-term basis (usually whole lifetime). TDI specifically occurs to chemicals that humans are exposed to unintentionally or as a contaminant, where acceptable daily intake refers to chemicals that are intentional added. TDI is generally written as a value of exposure (e.g. in milligrams) per kilogram (kg) body weight. Both ADI and TDI are usually assessed based on animal experiments, and it is most often hundreds of times lower than the dose causing no observable adverse effect (NOAEL) in the most sensitive tested animal species. Because the confounding factors (safety factors) may vary depending on the quality of data and the type of adverse effect, TDI values are not good estimates of the harmfulness of chemicals, and must be considered administrative tools to set allowable limits for chemicals, rather than scientific measures. The threshold limit value (TLV) of a chemical substance is a level to which it is believed a worker can be exposed day after day for a working lifetime without adverse effects.

== Examples of tolerable daily intake ==
=== World Health Organization ===
The World Health Organization (WHO) has introduced a TDI for melamine as 0.2 milligrams (mg)/kg body weight (b.w.) as of 2008. Similarly the established TDI range for dioxins according to WHO is 1-4 picograms toxic equivalency/kg body weight as of 1998. WHO's provisional maximum tolerable daily intake for all sources of iodine combined is 0.017 mg/kg b.w.

=== North America ===
==== Canada ====
The Canadian Government Health Protection Branch also uses tolerable daily intake. They have established TDI's for a wide variety of chemicals, listed below.

| Substance | TDI (oral) | TDI (inhalation) | Category |
|---|---|---|---|
| aniline | 7 micrograms/kg b.w./day | - | non-carcinogenic effects |
| bis (2-ethylhexyl phthalate) | 0.044 mg/kg b.w./day | - | non-carcinogenic effects |
| chlorobenzene | 0.43 mg/kg b.w./day | 0.01 mg/m^{3} (provisional) | non-carcinogenic effects |
| dibutyl phthalate | 0.063 mg/kg b.w./day | - | non-carcinogenic effects |
| dichlorobenzene | 0.11 mg/kg b.w./day | | non-carcinogenic effects |
| dichloromethane | 0.05 mg/kg b.w./day | - | non-carcinogenic effects |
| hexachlorobenzene | 500 ng/kg b.w./day | - | non-carcinogenic effects |
| inorganic fluoride | 200 micrograms/kg b.w./day (provisional) | - | non-carcinogenic effects |
| arsenic and its inorganic compounds | | 7.8 micrograms/m^{3} (air) 840 micrograms/litre (drinking water) | carcinogenic effects |
| benzene | | 15 mg/m^{3} | carcinogenic effects |
| cadmium | | 5.1 micrograms/m^{3} | carcinogenic effects |

==== United States ====
The United States Food and Drug Administration has used TDI for substances such as melamine, which is currently set at 0.063 mg/kg b.w./day.

=== Europe ===
==== European Food Safety Authority ====
The European Food Safety Authority has set a TDI for Bisphenol A at 0.2 nanograms per kilogram of b.w./day as of 2023.

=== Asia ===
==== Taiwan ====
As of 2011, the Taiwan Food and Drug Administration follows the TDI values set by the European Food Safety Administrations. This change was prompted by a 2011 food scandal where citizens where exposed to DEHP (di-2-ethylhexyl phthalate) after its intentional addition to food products.

==== Korea ====
The Official Journal of Korean Society of Toxicology as requested by the Korean National Institute for Food and Drug Safety Evaluation has recommend a TDI for BPA to be set at 0.05 mg/kg b.w./day.

== See also ==
- Recommended daily allowance
- Tolerable weekly intake
- Acceptable daily intake
