= Honoring our PACT Act of 2022 =

Law enacted by the United States Congress

- Long title: An Act to improve health care and benefits for veterans exposed to toxic substances, and for other purposes.
- Acronyms (colloquial): PACT
- Enacted by: the 117th United States Congress
- Effective: August 10, 2022
- Number of co-sponsors: 100

Citations
- Public law: Pub. L. 117–168 (text) (PDF)
- Statutes at Large: 136 Stat. 1759

Legislative history
- Introduced in the House as H.R.3967 by Mark Takano (D-CA) on June 17, 2021; Committee consideration by House Veterans' Affairs; House Armed Services; Passed the House on March 3, 2022 (256–174); Passed the Senate on June 16, 2022 (84–14); Agreed to by the House as S.3373 on July 13, 2022 (342–88) and by the Senate on August 2, 2022 (86–11); Signed into law by President Joe Biden on August 10, 2022

The Sergeant First Class Heath Robinson Honoring our Promise to Address Comprehensive Toxics Act of 2022, known as the Honoring our PACT Act of 2022, or even more colloquially as "the PACT Act," is an Act of Congress that authorized $797 billion in spending to significantly expand (the scope of benefits eligibility, for existing beneficiaries) and extend (benefits to newly eligible beneficiaries) entitlement to healthcare and disability compensation for veterans who were exposed to toxic substances during military service.

The act was first introduced on June 17, 2021, by Representative Mark Takano (D-CA). The House of Representatives passed the bill by 256–174 on March 3, 2022, and it passed the Senate by 84–14 on June 16, 2022. Due to a previously unnoticed technical constitutional issue with the bill, a revised version needed to pass the Senate again, but failed a cloture vote 55–42 on July 27, 2022, after 25 Republicans flipped their votes. Republicans cited a preexisting provision that made previously approved veterans' funding mandatory rather than discretionary as justification for their vote changes, while claiming the provision would increase spending authority unrelated to burn pits.

The failed cloture vote occurred immediately after the bipartisan CHIPS and Science Act passed the Senate, after which Senate Majority Leader Chuck Schumer and West Virginia Senator Joe Manchin announced their agreement on the Inflation Reduction Act of 2022. The failed cloture vote was widely seen from Democrats and veterans as retaliation for agreeing on the Inflation Reduction Act, a reconciliation bill requiring a simple majority in Senate for passage (with a tie-breaking vote from Vice President Kamala Harris).

Dozens of veterans, many of whom were exposed to burn pits themselves, continuously camped outside the United States Capitol in protest for five days. The bill passed the Senate by 86–11 on August 2, 2022, amid pressure from the veteran groups and other activists. There was no change in the funding mechanism or of the bill's text between the first and the second Senate vote. On August 10, 2022, it was signed into law by President Joe Biden.

== Background ==
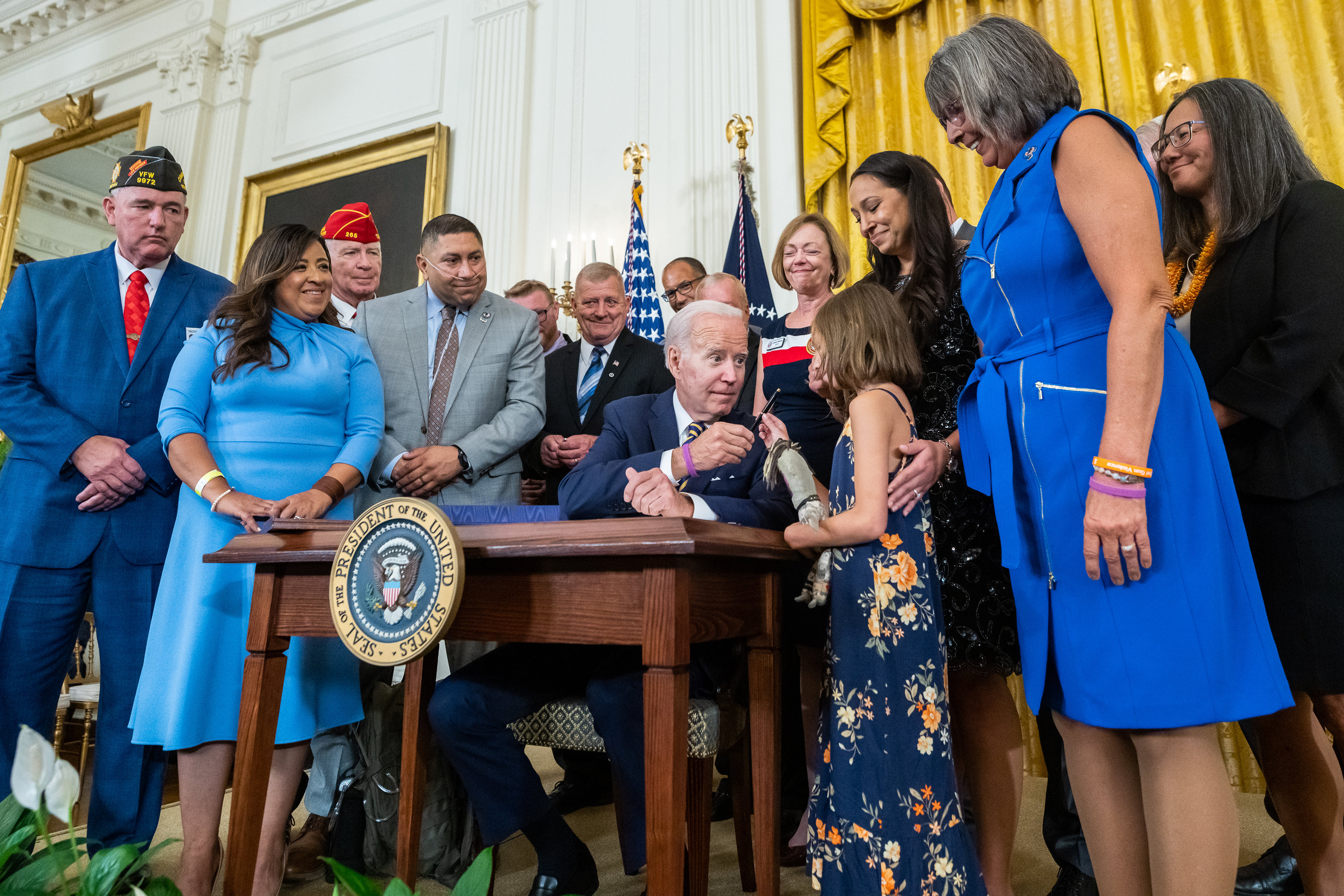
President Joe Biden signing the bill into law in the East Room of the White House on August 10, 2022.

Burn pits were used as a waste disposal method by the United States Armed Forces during the Gulf War, the Kosovo War, the War in Afghanistan, and the Iraq War, but have since been terminated due to the toxic fumes that posed health risks to nearby soldiers.

From 2007 to 2020, the Department of Veterans Affairs denied 78% of disability claims by veterans that were alleged to have been caused by burn pits. The Honoring our PACT Act removes the requirement that veterans prove that burn pits caused their illness and gives retroactive pay to veterans who did not receive care for their illnesses after claiming disability caused by burn pits. The Congressional Budget Office estimated the cost of the Act would be $300 billion from 2022 to 2032.

President Joe Biden has said he believes the brain cancer experienced by his son, Beau Biden, was a result of his exposure to burn pits during the Kosovo and Iraq Wars (Beau Biden died of that cancer in 2015).

== Namesake ==
The bill is named after Sergeant First Class Heath Robinson, a decorated combat medic. Sergeant First Class Heath Robinson deployed to Kosovo and Iraq with the Ohio National Guard. He died in 2020 from toxic exposure as a result of his military service. His wife, Danielle Robinson and her mother, Susan Zeier, have advocated for burn pit victims who were denied Veterans Administration benefits because the agency didn't believe their illnesses were service-related.

== Overview ==
The PACT Act is perhaps the largest health care and benefit expansion in VA history. The PACT Act brings these changes:

- Expands and extends eligibility for VA health care for Veterans with toxic exposures and Veterans of the Vietnam, Gulf War, and post-9/11 eras
- Adds 20+ more presumptive conditions for burn pits, Agent Orange, and other toxic exposures
- Adds more presumptive-exposure locations for Agent Orange and radiation
- Requires VA to provide a toxic exposure screening to every Veteran enrolled in VA health care
- Helps VA improve research, staff education, and treatment related to toxic exposures

== Camp LeJeune Justice Act of 2022 ==
Section 804 of the PACT Act contains a new federal cause of action for those exposed to and injured by the toxins in the water at Marine Corps Base Camp Lejeune. Until this became law, only exposed veterans had the possibility of compensation (as a VA disability benefit) because the federal courts cut off the right to sue under the Federal Tort Claims Act in MDL-2218.

== Legislative history ==
Congress	Short title	Bill number(s)	Date introduced	Sponsor(s)	# of cosponsors	Latest status
117th United States Congress	Honoring our PACT Act of 2022	H.R.3967	June 17, 2021	Mark Takano (D-CA)	100	Passed Senate with an amendment
117th United States Congress	Honoring our PACT Act of 2022	S.3373	December 9, 2021	Tim Kaine (D-VA)	2	Enacted

== Implementation ==
The United States Department of Veterans Affairs increased its staff hiring in 2023 and 2024 to address more than a million PACT Act-related claims. More than 80,000 VA employees, including many of those hired under PACT Act funding, were targeted to be fired by President Donald Trump and the Department of Government Efficiency.
