= Suiting Themselves =

2006 book by Sharon Beder

- Author: Sharon Beder
- Language: English
- Genre: Non-fiction
- Publisher: Earthscan
- Publication date: 2006
- ISBN: 978-1-844-07331-3

Suiting Themselves: How Corporations Drive the Global Agenda is a 2006 book by Professor Sharon Beder. Beder argues that an international corporate elite dictate global politics for their own benefit. She suggests that they created business associations and think tanks in the 1970s to drive public policy, push a free trade agenda, and promote the worldwide privatization and deregulation of public services in the 1980s and 1990s, and have worked since the late 1990s to rewrite the rules of the global economy.
