= Global Spin =

Book by Sharon Beder

- Author: Sharon Beder
- Publication date: 1997
- ISBN: 978-1-890132-12-5
- OCLC: 244104606

Global Spin: The Corporate Assault on Environmentalism is a book by Professor Sharon Beder. It was first published in 1997 and there have been subsequent updated editions in 2000 and 2002. The book uses many detailed case studies to build up a "bigger picture" of how large corporations attempt to manipulate environmental issues for their own ends. In the first edition most of the material was from the United States, where the corporate environmental impact has been greatest.

== See also ==
- List of Australian environmental books
- Unequal Protection: The Rise of Corporate Dominance and the Theft of Human Rights
