= CALUX =

Chemical Activated LUciferase gene eXpression (CALUX) is a ligand-dependent nuclear receptor-based bioassay used in the detection of specific chemicals or classes of chemicals in samples. It consists of a modified cell line that has been stably transfected with a DNA construct with a luciferase reporter gene under control of receptor-specific DNA response elements that can stimulate transcription of the inserted luciferase gene and produce the light-generating enzyme which can be easily measured. The DNA response elements can be varied in order to provide binding sites for other receptors that are regulated by a chemical or class of chemicals of interest that want to be detected. Thus, numerous CALUX bioassays have been developed for detection of diverse chemicals of interest. Most applications have been directed toward the detection of environmentally harmful chemicals, such as those affecting the endocrine system (environmental hormones).

CALUX is an effect based screening method, as it measures the total effect ligands (from a sample) have on a specific receptor. Unlike chemical analysis, CALUX is thus able to measure total activity on the receptor of interest. This includes both identified and unidentified activators (agonists) and inhibitors (receptor antagonists).

== Applications ==
The aryl hydrocarbon receptor (AhR)-responsive (AhR-CALUX) bioassay is commonly used in the detection of dioxins and dioxin-like compounds in sample extracts. It is based on the molecular mechanism by which the AhR activates gene expression. AhR-CALUX is used by researchers and companies that want to screen for the presence of dioxins and dioxin-like compounds in a wide variety of biological and environmental matrices, commercial and consumer products and in food and feed in order to evaluate their safety and/or level of contamination. While the measurement of dioxin and related dioxin-like chemicals in a sample extract using the AhR-CALUX bioassay is significantly cheaper than the chemical analysis requiring gas chromatography - high-resolution mass spectrometry (GC-HRMS), it only provides a measurement of the total level of AhR-active dioxins and related dioxin-like chemicals in a sample extract and determination of the specific congeners requires analysis any GC-HRMS. Additionally, given the recently established role of the AhR in human health and disease, the AhR-CALUX bioassay is also being used widely as a high-throughput screening method to identify and characterize AhR-active chemicals as potential human therapeutic drugs.

Environmental chemicals having sex hormone-like activity are detected by similar bioassays as well, including the Estrogen Receptor-Responsive CALUX (ER-CALUX) and Androgen Receptor-Responsive CALUX (AR-CALUX).

== See also ==
- Bioanalytical equivalent
