= Bioanalytical equivalent =

A bioanalytical equivalent (BEQ) is a unit of measurement in the field of environmental toxicology. It is widely used for mixtures and environmental samples to reflect the potential threat of pollutants in the environment and can be obtained by bioassays or using chemical analysis combined with relative potencies. One example is the bioassay CALUX for testing dioxins and dioxin-like compounds.
