= 2008 Chilean pork crisis =

The Chilean Pork crisis of 2008 was Chile's first ever mediatized dioxin crisis that led to major reputational and financial losses for the country due to a number of embargoes put up by importing countries like South-Korea. The main dioxin source has contaminated zinc oxide, which had been used as an animal feed ingredient for pigs. In reaction to the crisis the Chilean government has taken measures for the future to prevent such a crisis from happening again, by adopting regulation based upon European regulations for testing and concentration limits.

== Identification of Source ==
The Chilean pork crisis started in June 2008, when the National Veterinary Research and Quarantine Service (NVRQS) of South-Korea found high dioxin concentrations in imported pork from Chile. After being notified by the Korean authorities, the Chilean government started an investigation to try to contain the problem and find the source of contamination. Dioxin tests performed by Canadian laboratory pinpointed the contamination to zinc oxide, which was used as an ingredient for pork feed. The zinc oxide originated from an old rural facility that distributed animal feed. It was found that the contaminated ingredient was supplied by a metallurgic company that sold zinc oxide as a by-product from a smelting process of metal scrap. The smelting was not done under the right procedures (high enough temperature) to prevent dioxins from naturally forming. Furthermore, the ingredient sold as "zinc oxide" was not pure and was treated to obtain a whiter color, so it could be sold as pure zinc oxide on the market. Also according to Chilean legislation, the sale of this product into the animal supplement industry was an illegal activity. All the by-products of the metallurgic company that were sold as zinc oxide were in effect withheld and detained.

During the crisis eighty farms from nineteen companies were finally contaminated with dioxins. The crisis in Chile was in no way related to the 2008 Irish pork crisis of the same year. The sources in both cases were not of the same origin and thus unrelated.
