= Ethoxyresorufin-O-deethylase =

Biomarker used in fish bioassay

Ethoxyresorufin-O-deethylase (EROD) is used as a biomarker in fish bioassays through catalytic measurement of cytochrome p4501A1 induction.
