= Dioxins and dioxin-like compounds =

Class of chemical compounds

Dioxins and dioxin-like compounds (DLCs) are a group of chemical compounds that are persistent organic pollutants (POPs) in the environment. They are mostly by-products of burning or various industrial processes or, in the case of dioxin-like PCBs and PBBs, unwanted minor components of intentionally-produced mixtures.

Some of them are highly toxic, but the toxicity among them varies 30,000-fold. They are grouped together because their mechanisms of action are the same. They activate the aryl hydrocarbon receptor (AH receptor), albeit with very different binding affinities, leading to high differences in toxicity and other effects. They include:

- Polychlorinated dibenzo-p-dioxins (PCDDs), often referred to simply as dioxins. PCDDs are derivatives of dibenzo-p-dioxin. There are 75 PCDD congeners, differing in the number and locations of chlorine atoms, and 7 of them are specifically toxic, the most toxic being 2,3,7,8-tetrachlorodibenzodioxin (TCDD).
- Polychlorinated dibenzofurans (PCDFs), often referred to as furans. PCDFs are derivatives of dibenzofuran. There are 135 isomers; 10 have dioxin-like properties.
- Polychlorinated biphenyls (PCBs), derived from biphenyl. 12 PCBs have dioxin-like properties. Under certain conditions, PCBs may form dibenzofurans through partial oxidation.
- Polybrominated analogs of the above classes may have similar effects.
- "Dioxin" can also refer to 1,4-dioxin or p-dioxin, the basic chemical unit of the more complex dioxins. This simple compound is not persistent and has no PCDD-like toxicity.
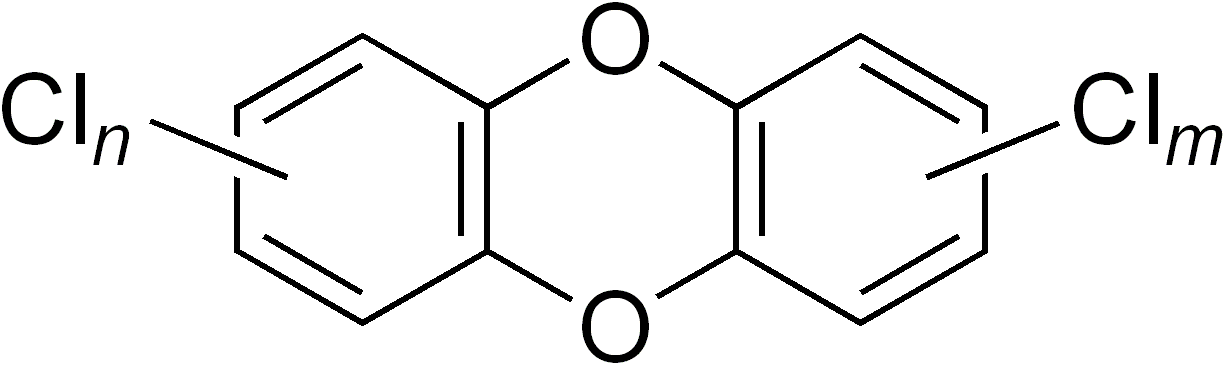
Polychlorinated dibenzo-p-dioxins

Polychlorinated dibenzofurans

Polychlorinated biphenyls

1,4-dioxin

Dioxins have different toxicities depending on the number and positions of the chlorine atoms. Because dioxins refers to such a broad class of compounds that vary widely in toxicity, the concept of toxic equivalency factor (TEF) has been developed to facilitate risk assessment and regulatory control. TEFs exist for seven congeners of dioxins, ten furans, and twelve PCBs. The reference congener is the most toxic dioxin (TCDD), which per definition has a TEF of one. In essence, multiplying the amount of a particular congener with its TEF produces the amount toxicologically equivalent to TCDD, and after this conversion, all dioxin-like congeners can be summed up, and the resulting toxicity equivalent quantity (TEQ) gives an approximation of toxicity of the mixture measured as TCDD.

Dioxins are virtually insoluble in water but have a relatively high solubility in lipids. Therefore, they tend to associate with organic matter such as plankton, plant leaves, and animal fat. In addition, they tend to be adsorbed to inorganic particles, such as ash and soil.

Dioxins are extremely stable and consequently tend to bioaccumulate in the food chain. They are eliminated very slowly in animals; for example, TCDD has a half-life of 7 to 9 years in humans. Incidents of contamination with PCBs are often reported as dioxin contamination incidents, since these are of most public and regulatory concern.

== Chemistry ==
There are 75 possible congeners of polychlorinated dibenzo-p-dioxins, but only 7 of them have affinity for the aryl hydrocarbon receptor (AH receptor) and are toxic via this mechanism. The crucial structures are so-called lateral chlorines in positions 2, 3, 7, and 8. These 4 chlorines also make the congeners persistent, because they prevent microbial degradation. Additional chlorines make the compounds less potent, but basically the effects remain the same, although at higher doses. There are 135 possible dibenzofurans, and 10 in which the lateral chlorines are dioxin-like.

Critical structures of PCDD/Fs.

There are 209 PCB compounds. Analogously to PCDDs, at least two lateral chlorines in each ring in positions 3, 4, or 5 are needed for dioxin-like activity. Because the AH receptor requires a planar (flat) structure, only PCB congeners that can rotate freely along the C–C axis between the rings can bind to the receptor. Substituents in ortho-positions 2 and 6 prevent rotation and thus hinder the molecule from assuming a planar position. Mono-ortho congeners (one Cl in 2, 2', 6, or 6') have minimal activity. No significant dioxin-like activities have been noticed when there are two or more ortho-chlorines. Brominated dioxins and biphenyls have similar properties, but they have been studied much less.

Structures of biphenyl and 3,3',4,4',5-pentachlorobiphenyl

Many natural compounds have a very high agonistic affinity to the dioxin receptor. These include indole alkaloids (such as indigo dye), flavones, benzoflavones, imidazoles, and pyridines. These compounds are metabolized rapidly, but continuous intake from food may cause similar receptor activation as the background levels of dioxins.

== Mechanism of action ==
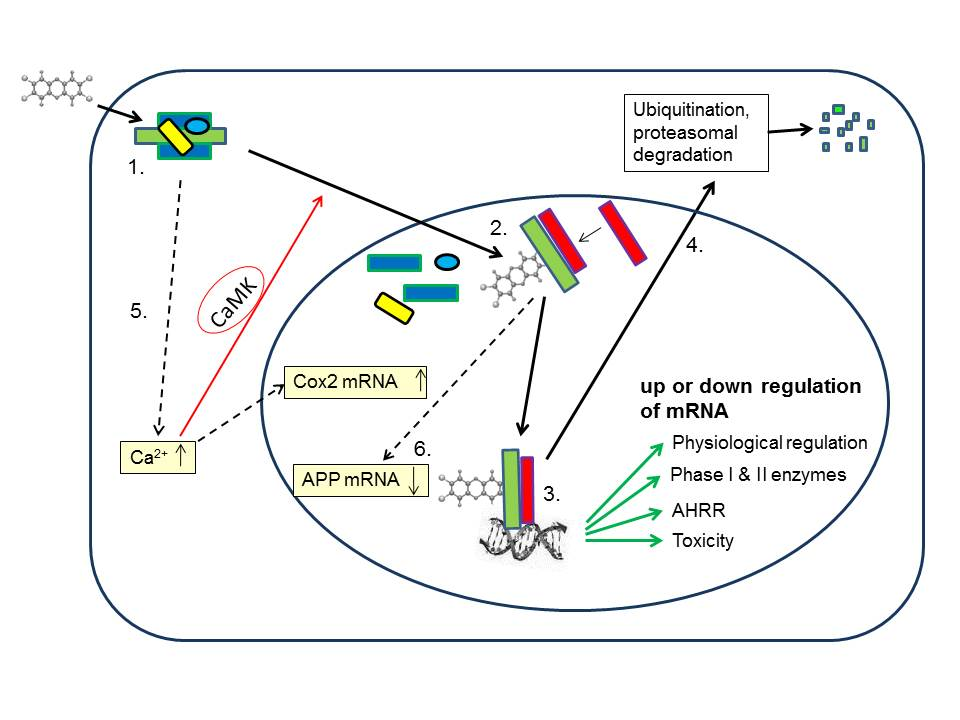
A schematic diagram of some AHR signaling pathways. The canonical pathway is depicted with solid black arrows, alternative pathways with dashed arrows, and an intersection of these two with a solid red arrow. The green bars represent the AHR, red bars ARNT, yellow bars ARA9 (AIP, Xap2), blue bars HSP90, and the blue ovals p23. Dioxin binding to the AHR (1.) leads to its translocation into the nucleus by importin-β, (2.) heterodimerization with ARNT and binding to the DNA at DREs, (3.) modulating expression levels of target genes (green arrows). One of the gene products elevated by this mechanism is AHRR, a repressor protein which forms a feedback loop that inhibits AHR action. The AHR is finally degraded by the ubiquitin–proteasome system (4.). AHR activation can also rapidly increase intracellular Ca^{2+} concentration (5.) which in turn may ultimately result in augmented Cox2 gene expression. Elevation of Ca^{2+} activates CaMKs, which appear to have a critical role in the translocation of the AHR. Another example of effects mediated by the AHR via non-canonical pathways is suppression of acute-phase proteins (6.) which does not involve DNA binding. (simplified and modified from Lindén et al.)

The aryl hydrocarbon receptor (AH receptor) is an ancient receptor, and its many functions have been revealed only recently. It is an over-600-million-year-old protein occurring in all vertebrates, and its homologs have been discovered in invertebrates and insects. It is classified as a member of the basic helix-loop-helix/Per-Arnt-Sim (bHLH/PAS) family of transcription factors, and it acts to modify transcription of a number of genes (see figure). AH-receptor activity is necessary for normal development and many physiological functions. Mice lacking the AH receptor (knockouts) are sick with cardiac hypertrophy, liver fibrosis, reproductive problems, and impaired immunology.

The AH receptor is relevant in toxicology for two very different reasons. First, it induces several enzymes important in the metabolism of foreign substances, so-called xenobiotics. These include both oxidative phase I enzymes and conjugative phase II enzymes, such as CYP1A2, CYP1B1, CYP2S1, CYP2A5, ALDH3, GSTA1, UGT1A1, UGT1A6, UGT1A7, and NQO1. This is in essence a protective function preventing toxic or carcinogenic effects of xenobiotics, but in some conditions it may also result in the production of reactive metabolites that are mutagenic and carcinogenic. This enzyme induction can be initiated by many natural or synthetic compounds, e.g., carcinogenic polycyclic hydrocarbons such as benzo(a)pyrene, several natural compounds, and dioxins. Secondly, AH receptors are involved in the activation or silencing of genes that lead to the toxic effects of high doses of dioxins. Because TCDD at high doses can influence the transcription of perhaps hundreds of genes, the genes crucial for the multitude of toxic effects of dioxins are still not known very well.

Binding of dioxin-like compounds to the AH receptor has made it possible to measure total dioxin-like activity of a sample using CALUX (Chemical Activated LUciferase gene eXpression) bioassay. The results have been comparable to TEQ levels measured by much-more-expensive gas chromatography–high-resolution mass spectrometry in environmental samples.

== Toxicity ==
Dioxin toxicity is based on inappropriate activation of a physiologically important receptor, and therefore dose-response must be carefully considered. Inappropriate stimulation of many receptors leads to toxic outcomes, e.g. overdose of vitamin A leads to inappropriate activation of retinoid receptors resulting in (for example) malformations, and overdoses of corticosteroids or sex hormones lead to a multitude of adverse effects. Therefore, it is important to separate the effects of low doses causing activation of the receptor around the physiological range from the effects of high toxic doses. This is all the more important because of large differences in exposures even among humans. Western populations today are exposed to dioxins at doses leading to concentrations of 5 to 100 picograms/g (as TEQ in body fat), and the highest concentrations in accidental or deliberate poisonings have been 10,000 to 144,000 pg/g, leading to dramatic but not lethal outcomes.

The most relevant toxic outcomes of dioxins both in humans and animals are cancer and the developmental effects on offspring. Both have been documented at high doses, most accurately in animal experiments. As to developmental effects, there is an agreement that the present dioxin levels in many populations are not very far from those causing some effects, but there is not yet consensus on the safe level. As to cancer, there is a disagreement on how to extrapolate the risk from high toxic doses to the present low exposures.

While the affinity of dioxins and related industrial toxicants to the Ah receptor may not fully explain all their toxic effects including immunotoxicity, endocrine effects, and tumor promotion, toxic responses appear to be typically dose-dependent within certain concentration ranges. A multiphasic dose–response relationship has also been reported, leading to uncertainty and debate about the true role of dioxins in cancer rates. The endocrine-disrupting activity of dioxins is thought to occur as a downstream function of AH receptor activation, with thyroid status in particular being a sensitive marker of exposure. TCDD, along with the other PCDDs, PCDFs, and dioxin-like coplanar PCBs are not direct agonists or antagonists of hormones, and are not active in assays that directly screen for these activities such as ER-CALUX and AR-CALUX. These compounds have also not been shown to have any direct mutagenic or genotoxic activity. Their main action in causing cancer is cancer promotion. A mixture of PCBs such as Aroclor may contain PCB compounds which are known estrogen agonists but are not classified as dioxin-like in terms of toxicity. Mutagenic effects have been established for some lower-chlorinated chemicals such as 3-chlorodibenzofuran, which is neither persistent nor an AH receptor agonist.

=== Toxicity in animals ===
High doses. The symptoms reported to be associated with dioxin toxicity in animal studies are incredibly wide-ranging, both in the scope of the biological systems affected and in the range of dosage needed to bring these about. A single high-dose TCDD exposure causes cachexia that is fatal 1 to 6 weeks later. The LD_{50} of TCDD varies wildly between species and even strains of the same species, with the most notable disparity being between the seemingly similar species of hamster and guinea pig. The oral LD_{50} for guinea pigs is as low as 0.5 to 2 μg/kg body weight, whereas the oral LD_{50} for hamsters can be as high as 1 to 5 mg/kg body weight. Even between different mouse or rat strains, there may be tenfold-to-thousandfold differences in acute toxicity. Many pathological findings are seen in the liver, thymus, and other organs. Some effects such as thymic atrophy are common in many species, but (for example) liver toxicity is typical in rabbits.

Low doses. Very few signs of toxicity are seen in adult animals after low doses, but developmental effects may occur at low dioxin levels, including foetal, infant, and possibly pubescent stages. Well-established developmental effects are cleft palate, hydronephrosis, disturbances in tooth development and sexual development, and endocrine effects. Surprisingly, enzyme induction, several developmental effects, and aversion to new foods occur at similar dose levels in animals that respond differently to acute high-dose toxicity. Therefore, it has been suggested that dioxin effects be divided to type I effects (enzyme induction etc.) and type II effects (lethality, liver damage, anorexia, and tumour promotion). The reason may be different requirements of the transactivation domain structure of the AH receptor for different genes. Some of these low-dose effects can in fact be interpreted as protective rather than toxic (enzyme induction, aversion to new foods).

=== Human toxicity ===
==== High doses ====
Toxicity of dioxins at high doses has been well-documented after accidents, deliberate poisonings, food-contamination episodes, and high industrial exposures. Three women in Vienna, Austria, were poisoned with large doses of TCDD in 1998. The highest concentration of TCDD in fat tissue was 144,000 pg/g, the highest ever reported in human beings. The main feature was chloracne, a serious skin disease. The victim survived, and other symptoms were modest after initial gastrointestinal symptoms and amenorrhea. Another acute incident was the deliberate poisoning of Victor Yushchenko, then presidential candidate of Ukraine, in 2004. TCDD concentration in fat was 108,000 pg/g. In this case, the most prominent symptoms were chloracne, hepatitis, and pancreatitis. The deliberate poisoning case shows that a human is not as sensitive as other animals, since Yushchenko survived a dose estimated at around 25 μg/kg.

Two serious food-contamination accidents were caused by PCB oils used in heat exchangers. The PCB oil leaked to rice bran oil consumed by thousands of people in Japan (Yusho disease 1968) and Taiwan (Yu-cheng disease 1979). The toxic effects have been attributed to dioxin-like PCBs and PCDFs. Their daily intake was up to 100,000 times higher than average intake presently. There were many skin problems, chloracne, swelling of eyelids, and hypersecretion of Meibomian glands in the eyes. Babies born to Yusho and Yu-cheng mothers were smaller than normal, and they had dark pigmentation and sometimes teeth at birth and tooth deformities. Foetal deaths and miscarriages were common.

Perhaps the best-known dioxin accident occurred in Seveso, Italy, in 1976. A tank of chlorophenols released its contents to air, including many kilograms of TCDD, and contaminated much of the city. The highest TCDD levels were found in children, up to 56,000 pg/g fat. Acute effects were limited to chloracne, although many animals such as rabbits died after eating contaminated grass. Dental aberrations were found after 25 years in persons exposed as children, and a slightly increased cancer risk was confirmed 35 years later.

In line with animal studies, developmental effects may be much more important than effects in adults. These include disturbances of tooth development and of sexual development.

An example of the variation in responses is clearly seen in a study following the Seveso disaster indicating that sperm count and motility were affected in different ways in exposed males, depending on whether they were exposed before, during, or after puberty.

In occupational settings, many symptoms have been seen, but exposures have always been to a multitude of chemicals including chlorophenols, chlorophenoxy acid herbicides, and solvents. Therefore, definitive proof of dioxins as causative factors has been difficult to obtain. By far the best-proven effect is chloracne. The suspected effects in adults are liver damage and alterations in heme metabolism, serum lipid levels, and thyroid functions, as well as diabetes and immunological effects.

==== Low exposures ====
Effects after low exposures such as from food have been difficult to prove. Levels of dioxins in contemporary populations are 5 to 20 pg/g (TEQ in fat) and 50 to 100 pg in older people or at least 1000 times lower than those in poisonings (see above). Tooth deformities have been considered plausible after long breast-feeding, when the dioxin concentrations were high in 1970s and 1980s. When the concentrations decreased during 1990s and 2000s, the effects were no longer seen. According to a study in Russia, sperm counts in 18–19-year-old men were lower when dioxin levels were higher at the age of 8 to 9 years. This was in industrial environments causing relatively high exposures to boys as well as their mothers. The contamination panel of the European Food Safety Agency (EFSA) recommended decreasing tolerable weekly intake (TWI) levels based on the Russian children study. This recommendation can be challenged, because it does not properly consider competing risks following from lost benefits of important and healthy food items such as certain fish. TWI levels are not applied for breast feeding, because benefits of breast milk are judged to be far more important than the remote risks of dioxins. A general conclusion may be that safety margins are not very great concerning developmental effects, but toxic effects are not likely at the present population levels of dioxins.

A number of cross-sectional studies have shown associations between type 2 diabetes and several POP compounds including dioxins. Such observational studies cannot prove causality; that is, there may be an association which does not prove that one is the cause of the other. The main problem is that similar associations can be found with many quite different POPs, which have only long half-lives and tendency to accumulate in lipids in common. This suggests that they may all be related to diet and obesity, which are by far the most common causes of type 2 diabetes.

There have been speculations on various effects of dioxins on endometriosis, sexual development, liver function, thyroid hormone levels, white-blood-cell levels, immune functions, and even learning and intelligence. While some of these effects might be possible after heavy exposures (like in the Seveso disaster), these claims are only based on potential exposures of population, not supported by actual measurements of dioxin concentrations. For example, absorption from bleached tampons claimed to be associated with endometriosis is insignificant compared with daily dioxin intake from food.

=== Carcinogenicity ===
Dioxins are well-established carcinogens in animal studies, although the precise mechanism is not clear. Dioxins are not mutagenic or genotoxic. The United States Environmental Protection Agency has categorised dioxin, and the mixture of substances associated with sources of dioxin toxicity, as a "likely human carcinogens". The International Agency for Research on Cancer has classified TCDD as a human carcinogen (class 1) on the basis of clear animal carcinogenicity and limited human data, and subsequently also 2,3,4,7,8-PCDF and PCB 126 as class 1 carcinogens. The mechanism is thought to be mainly promotion; that is, dioxins can accelerate the formation of tumours caused by other factors, and adversely affect the normal mechanisms for inhibiting tumour growth. Some researchers have also proposed that dioxin induces cancer progression through a very different mitochondrial pathway.

As with many toxic endpoints of dioxin, a clear dose–response relationship is difficult to establish. After accidental or high occupational exposures there is evidence on human carcinogenicity. Increases in cancer have been modest; in fact, reaching statistical significance has been difficult even after high accidental or occupational exposures like in the Yusho and Yucheng poisonings, Seveso accident, and combined occupational cohorts. Therefore, controversies on cancer risk at low population levels of dioxins are understandable. The problem with IARC evaluations is that they only assess hazard, that is, carcinogenicity at any dose. It is likely that there is a practical safe threshold for the non-genotoxic dioxins, and the present population levels do not possess any risk of cancer. There is thus some agreement that cancer risk is taken care of as well, if daily intake limits are set to protect from developmental effects. Among fishermen with high dioxin concentrations in their bodies, cancer deaths were decreased rather than increased. All this means that, in case of important beneficial food items and breast feeding, a thorough risk-benefit analysis is needed before setting limits, in order to avoid increased other risks or lost benefits.

=== Risk assessment ===
The uncertainty and variability in the dose–response relationship of dioxins in terms of their toxicity, as well as the ability of dioxins to bioaccumulate, have led WHO experts to recommend a very low tolerable daily intake (TDI) of dioxin, 1–4 pg/kg body weight per day, i.e. 7×10^{−11} to 2.8×10^{−10} g per 70-kg person per day, to allow for this uncertainty and ensure public safety in all instances. Authorities have then set weekly or monthly intake levels that equal to TDIs around 2 pg/kg. Because dioxins are eliminated very slowly, the body burden accumulated during a whole lifetime is high compared with daily doses, and occasional modest exceedances of limit values do not change it much. Therefore, long-term intake is much more important than daily intake. Specifically, the TDI has been assessed to guarantee the safety of children born to mothers exposed to such a daily intake of dioxins all their lifetime prior to pregnancy. It is likely that the TDI for other population groups could be higher.

One important cause for differences in different assessments has been carcinogenicity. If the dose-response of TCDD in causing cancer is linear, then it might be a true risk. If the dose-response is of a threshold-type or J-shape, then there is little or no risk at the present concentrations. Understanding the mechanisms of toxicity better is hoped to increase the reliability of risk assessment. Recently, developmental effects have been reassessed by the Contamination Panel of the European Food Safety Agency (EFSA). They propose decreasing the tolerable weekly intake (TWI) from 14 pg/kg to 2 pg/kg. This is likely to cause another controversy before being accepted by European countries. Dioxin intake and levels in breast milk in 1970s and 1980s were 5 to 10 times higher than presently, and very few effects have been found, possibly mild developmental effects on teeth.

=== Toxicity equivalents ===
All dioxin-like compounds share a common mechanism of action via the aryl hydrocarbon receptor (AHR), but their potencies are very different. This means that similar effects are caused by all of them, but much larger doses of some of them are needed than of TCDD. Binding to the AHR as well as persistence in the environment and in the organism depends on the presence of so-called "lateral chlorines"; in case of dioxins and furans, these are chlorine substitutes in positions 2, 3, 7, and 8. Each additional non-lateral chlorine decreases the potency, but qualitatively the effects remain similar. Therefore, a simple sum of different dioxin congeners is not a meaningful measure of toxicity. To compare the toxicities of various congeners and to render it possible to make a toxicologically meaningful sum of a mixture, a toxicity equivalency (TEQ) concept was created.

Each congener has been given a toxicity equivalence factor (TEF). This indicates its relative toxicity as compared with TCDD. Most TEFs have been extracted from in vivo toxicity data on animals, but if these are missing (such as in case of some PCBs), less-reliable in vitro data have been used. After multiplying the actual amount or concentration of a congener by its TEF, the product is the virtual amount or concentration of TCDD having effects of the same magnitude as the compound in question. This multiplication is done for all compounds in a mixture, and these "equivalents of TCDD" can then simply be added, resulting in TEQ, the amount or concentration of TCDD toxicologically equivalent to the mixture.

The TEQ conversion makes it possible to use all studies on the best-studied TCDD to assess the toxicity of a mixture. This is most useful in regulatory work, but it can also be used in scientific studies. This resembles the common measure of all alcoholic drinks: beer, wine, and whiskey can be added together as absolute alcohol, and this sum gives the toxicologically meaningful measure of the total impact.

The TEQ only applies to dioxin-like effects mediated by the AHR. Some toxic effects (especially of PCBs) may be independent of the AHR, and those are not taken into account by using TEQs.

TEFs are also approximations with certain amount of scientific judgement rather than scientific facts. Therefore, they may be re-evaluated from time to time. There have been several TEF versions since the 1980s. The most recent re-assessment was by an expert group of the World Health Organization in 2005.

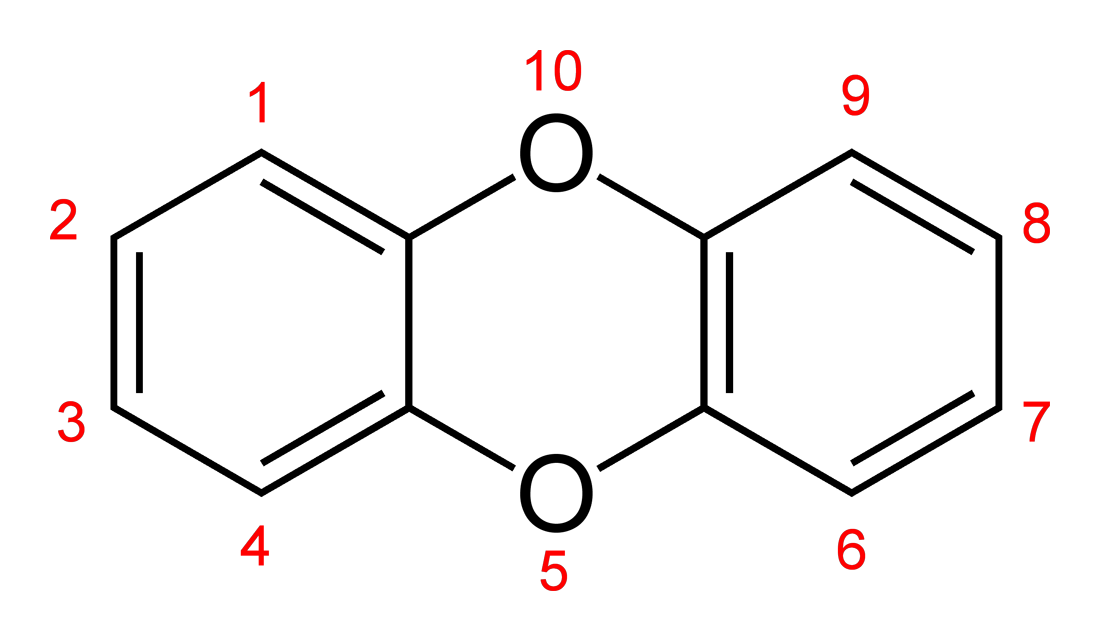
The skeletal formula and substituent numbering scheme of the parent compound dibenzo-p-dioxin

WHO Toxic Equivalence Factors (WHO-TEF) for the dioxin-like congeners of concern
Class	Congener	Toxic Equivalence Factor
Polychlorinated dioxins	2,3,7,8-TCDD	1
Polychlorinated dioxins	1,2,3,7,8-PeCDD	1
Polychlorinated dioxins	1,2,3,4,7,8-HxCDD	0.1
Polychlorinated dioxins	1,2,3,6,7,8-HxCDD	0.1
Polychlorinated dioxins	1,2,3,7,8,9-HxCDD	0.1
Polychlorinated dioxins	1,2,3,4,6,7,8-HpCDD	0.01
Polychlorinated dioxins	OCDD	0.0003
Polychlorinated dibenzofurans	2,3,7,8-TCDF	0.1
Polychlorinated dibenzofurans	1,2,3,7,8-PeCDF	0.03
Polychlorinated dibenzofurans	2,3,4,7,8-PeCDF	0.3
Polychlorinated dibenzofurans	1,2,3,4,7,8-HxCDF	0.1
Polychlorinated dibenzofurans	1,2,3,6,7,8-HxCDF	0.1
Polychlorinated dibenzofurans	1,2,3,7,8,9-HxCDF	0.1
Polychlorinated dibenzofurans	2,3,4,6,7,8-HxCDF	0.1
Polychlorinated dibenzofurans	1,2,3,4,6,7,8-HpCDF	0.01
Polychlorinated dibenzofurans	1,2,3,4,7,8,9-HpCDF	0.01
Polychlorinated dibenzofurans	OCDF	0.0003
Non-ortho-substituted PCBs	3,3',4,4'-TCB (77)	0.0001
Non-ortho-substituted PCBs	3,4,4',5-TCB (81)	0.0003
Non-ortho-substituted PCBs	3,3',4,4',5-PeCB (126)	0.1
Non-ortho-substituted PCBs	3,3',4,4',5,5'-HxCB (169)	0.03
Mono-ortho-substituted PCBs	2,3,3',4,4'-PeCB (105)	0.00003
Mono-ortho-substituted PCBs	2,3,4,4',5-PeCB (114)	0.00003
Mono-ortho-substituted PCBs	2,3',4,4',5-PeCB (118)	0.00003
Mono-ortho-substituted PCBs	2',3,4,4',5-PeCB (123)	0.00003
Mono-ortho-substituted PCBs	2,3,3',4,4',5-HxCB (156)	0.00003
Mono-ortho-substituted PCBs	2,3,3',4,4',5'-HxCB (157)	0.00003
Mono-ortho-substituted PCBs	2,3',4,4',5,5'-HxCB (167)	0.00003
Mono-ortho-substituted PCBs	2,3,3',4,4',5,5'-HpCB (189)	0.00003

(T = tetra, Pe = penta, Hx = hexa, Hp = hepta, O = octa)

The 2,3,7,8-substituted PCDDs

The 2,3,7,8-substituted PCDFs

Dioxin-like PCBs

=== Controversy ===
Greenpeace and some other environmental groups have called for the chlorine industry to be phased out. However, chlorine industry supporters say that "banning chlorine would mean that millions of people in the third world would die from want of disinfected water". Sharon Beder and others have argued that the dioxin controversy has been very political and that large companies have tried to play down the seriousness of the problems of dioxin. The companies involved have often said that the campaign against dioxin is based on "fear and emotion" and not on science.

== Human intake and levels ==
Most intake of dioxin-like chemicals is from food of animal origin: meat, dairy products, or fish predominate, depending on the country. The daily intake of dioxins and dioxin-like PCBs as TEQ is of the order of 100 pg/day, i.e. 1–2 pg/kg/day. In many countries, both the absolute and relative significance of dairy products and meat have decreased due to strict emission controls, and brought about the decrease of total intake. For example, in the United Kingdom, the total intake of PCDD/F in 1982 was 239 pg/day and in 2001 only 21 pg/day (WHO-TEQ). Since the half-lives are very long (for e.g. TCDD 7–8 years), the body burden will increase almost over the whole lifetime. Therefore, the concentrations may increase five to tenfold from age 20 to age 60. For the same reason, short-term higher intake (such as after food-contamination incidents) is not crucial unless it is extremely high or lasts for several months or years.

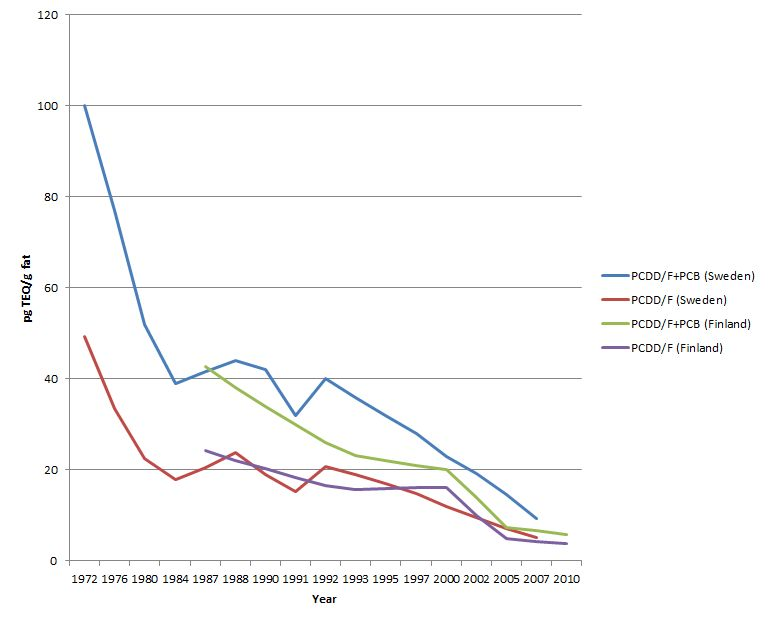
Decrease of dioxin concentrations in breast milk in Sweden and Finland

The highest body burdens were found in Western Europe in the 1970s and early 1980s, and the trends have been similar in the U.S. The most useful measure of time trends is concentration in breast milk measured over decades. In many countries, concentrations have decreased to about one tenth of those in the 1970s, and the total TEQ concentrations are now of the order of 5–30 pg/g fat The decrease is due to strict emission controls and also to the control of concentrations in food. In the US young adult female population (ages 20–39), the concentration was 9.7 pg/g lipid in 2001–2002 (geometric mean).

Certain professions such as subsistence fishermen in some areas are exposed to exceptionally high amounts of dioxins and related substances. This along with high industrial exposures may be the most valuable source of information on the health risks of dioxins.

=== Fate of dioxins in human body ===
Dioxins are absorbed well from the digestive tract if they are dissolved in fats or oils (such as in fish or meat). On the other hand, dioxins tend to adsorb tightly to soil particles, and absorption may be quite low: 13.8% of the given dose of TEQs in contaminated soil was absorbed.

The same features causing persistence of dioxins in the environment also cause very slow elimination in humans and animals. Because of low water solubility, kidneys cannot excrete them in urine as such. They must first be metabolised to more-water-soluble metabolites, but that metabolism, especially in humans, is extremely slow. This results in biological half-lives of several years for all dioxins. That of TCDD is estimated to be 7 to 8 years, and for other PCDD/Fs from 1.4 to 13 years, with PCDFs on average slightly shorter than PCDDs.

In mammals, dioxins are found mostly in fat. Concentrations in fat seem to be relatively similar, be it serum fat, adipose tissue fat, or milk fat. This permits measuring dioxin burden by analysing breast milk. Initially, however, at least in laboratory animals, after a single dose, high concentrations are found in the liver, but in a few days, adipose tissue will predominate. In rat liver, however, high doses cause induction of CYP1A2 enzyme, and this binds dioxins. Thus, depending on the dose, the ratio of fat and liver tissue concentrations may vary considerably in rodents.

Elimination half-lives in humans of some PCDD/Fs.
Congener	Half-life, years
2,3,7,8-TCDD	7.2
1,2,3,7,8-PeCDD	11.2
1,2,3,4,7,8-HxCDD	9.8
1,2,3,6,7,8-HxCDD	13.1
1,2,3,7,8,9-HxCDD	5.1
1,2,3,4,6,7,8-HpCDD	4.9
OCDD	6.7
2,3,7,8-TCDF	2.1
1,2,3,7,8-PeCDF	3.5
2,3,4,7,8-PeCDF	7.0
1,2,3,4,7,8-HxCDF	6.4
1,2,3,6,7,8-HxCDF	7.2
1,2,3,7,8,9-HxCDF	7.2
2,3,4,6,7,8-HxCDF	2.8
1,2,3,4,6,7,8-HpCDF	3.1
1,2,3,4,7,8,9-HpCDF	4.6
OCDF	1.4

== Uses ==
Dioxins have no common uses. They are manufactured on a small scale for chemical and toxicological research, but mostly exist as by-products of industrial processes such as chlorine bleaching of paper pulp, pesticide manufacture, and combustion processes such as incineration. The defoliant Agent Orange contained trace amounts of dioxin impurities and caused severe health issues as a result. The wood preservative pentachlorophenol often contained dioxins and dibenzofurans as impurities. The Stockholm Convention banned the production and use of dioxins in 2001.

== Sources ==
=== Environmental sources ===
PCDD/F compounds were never synthesized for any purpose, except for small quantities for scientific research. Small amounts of PCDD/Fs are formed whenever organics, oxygen, and chlorine are available at suitable temperatures. This is augmented by metal catalysts such as copper. The optimal temperature range is 400–700 °C (752–1,292 °F). This means that formation is highest when organic material is burned in less-than-optimal conditions such as open fires, building fires, domestic fireplaces, and poorly operated or designed solid-waste incinerators. Historically, municipal and medical waste incineration was the most important source of PCDD/Fs.

PCB compounds, always containing low concentrations of dioxin-like PCBs and PCDFs, were synthesized for various technical purposes (see polychlorinated biphenyls). They have entered the environment through accidents such as fires or leaks from transformers or heat exchangers, or from PCB-containing products in landfills or during incineration. Because PCBs are somewhat volatile, they have also been transported long distances by air, leading to global distribution including the Arctic. Only a minor portion of PCBs in mixtures are dioxin-like.

Other sources of PCDD/F include:

- Uncontrolled combustion, particularly open burning of waste ("backyard barrel burning"), accidental fires, wildfires. These are presently the most important sources.
- Metal smelting and refining
- Chlorine bleaching of pulp and paper – historically important source of PCDD/Fs to waterways.
- Synthesis side products of several chemicals, especially PCBs, chlorophenols, chlorophenoxy acid herbicides, and hexachlorophene.
- Engines using leaded fuel, which contained the additives 1,2-dichloroethane and 1,2-dibromoethane.

==== In waste incineration ====
Improvements and changes have been made to nearly all industrial sources to reduce PCDD/F production. In waste incineration, large amounts of publicity and concern surrounded dioxin-like compounds during the 1980s–1990s continues to pervade the public consciousness, especially when new incineration and waste-to-energy facilities are proposed. As a result of these concerns, incineration processes have been improved with increased combustion temperatures (over 1,000 °C (1,830 °F)), better furnace control, and sufficient residence time allotted to ensure complete oxidation of organic compounds. Incineration or "coprocessing" of municipal and solid industrial wastes in cement kilns is another proven source of PCDD/F compounds despite extreme high temperatures of 1,400–1,500 °C (2,550–2,730 °F), posing a risk in countries where coprocessing is increasingly employed as a primary waste-management strategy if appropriate environmental monitoring and controls are not put in place. Ideally, an incineration process oxidizes all carbon to CO_{2} and converts all chlorine to HCl or inorganic chlorides prior to the gases passing through the temperature window of 400-700 °C where PCDD/F formation is possible. These substances cannot easily form organic compounds, and HCl is easily and safely neutralized in the scrubber while CO_{2} is vented to the atmosphere. Inorganic chlorides are incorporated into the ash.

Scrubbers and particulate-removal systems manage to capture some of the PCDD/F that forms even in sophisticated incineration plants. These PCDD/Fs are generally not destroyed but moved into the fly ash. Catalytic systems have been designed which destroy vapor-phase PCDD/Fs at relatively low temperatures. This technology is often combined with the baghouse or SCR system at the tail end of an incineration plant.

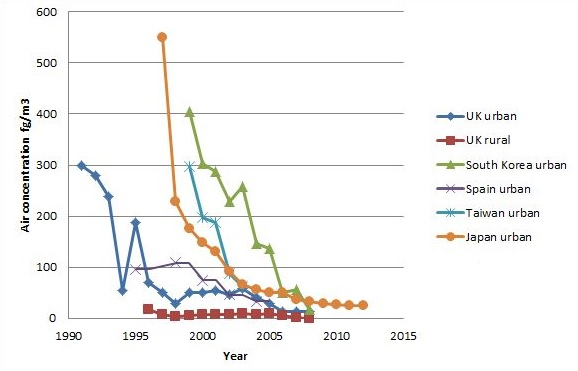
Decrease of dioxins in ambient air in different regions (redrawn from Dopico and Gomez, 2015)

The European Union limit for concentration of dioxin-like compounds in the discharged flue gas is 0.1 ng/Nm^{3} TEQ.

In both Europe the USA, emissions of dioxins have decreased dramatically since the 1980s, by even 90% (see Figure). This has also led to decreases in human body burdens, which is neatly demonstrated by the decrease of dioxin concentrations in breast milk. With the substantial decrease of emissions from municipal waste incinerators, other potentially large sources of dioxin-like compounds, for example from forest and wild fires, have increased relative to industrial sources. They are however not included in the total inventory due to uncertainties in available data. A more recent study on the environmental effects of accidental fires, including forest fires, estimated the emissions from dioxins (PCDD/Fs) to be about equivalent to those from traffic and municipal waste combustion.

Open burning of waste (backyard barrel burning) has not decreased effectively, and in the US it is now the most important source of dioxins. Total US annual emissions decreased from 14 kilograms (31 lb) in 1987 to 1.4 kilograms (3.1 lb) in 2000. However, backyard barrel burning decreased only modestly from 0.6 kilograms (1.3 lb) to 0.5 kilograms (1.1 lb), resulting in over one third of all dioxins in the year 2000 from backyard burning alone.

==== Other sources ====
Low concentrations of dioxins have been found in some soils without any anthropogenic contamination. A puzzling case of milk contamination was detected in Germany. The source was found to be kaolin added to animal feed. Dioxins have been repeatedly detected in clays from Europe and the USA since 1996, with contamination of clay assumed to be the result of ancient forest fires or similar natural events with concentration of the PCDD/F during clay sedimentation.

==== Dioxins and biomass ====
In sugarcane cultivation, the remaining bagasse after extraction of sugar is used in large amounts for energy production (both process heat and electric energy for use both in the sugar factory itself and for other consumers), and locally it has been thought to be a remarkable source of dioxins. This basically indicates that burning biomass produces dioxins and it should be done at high enough temperatures and there should be proper filtering of flue gases. For the treatment of gases and pollutants, sugarcane industries often use wet gas scrubbers, such as the Venturi type. In addition, other treatment systems also used are electrostatic precipitators and bag filters. These methods may be insufficient. Improperly burned biomass, which undergoes only low-temperature incomplete combustion, is responsible for much of the negative health effects of indoor air pollution and is a particular problem in the Global South where biomass like wood or cow dung are often the only commonly available fuels for cooking and home heating. In addition to dioxins, other harmful products of incomplete combustion – such as carbon monoxide – are also released when biomass is burned in low-oxygen conditions. Using plastic, particularly chlorine-containing plastics such as polyvinyl chloride, as a fuel or firestarter further increases dioxin emissions.

=== Environmental persistence and bioaccumulation ===
All groups of dioxin-like compounds are persistent in the environment. Very few soil microbes or animals can break down the PCDD/Fs with lateral chlorines (positions 2, 3, 7, and 8). Lipophilicity (tendency to seek for fat-like environments) and very poor water solubility make these compounds move from water environment to living organisms having lipid cell structures. This is called bioaccumulation. Increase in chlorination increases both stability and lipophilicity. The compounds with the very highest chlorine numbers (e.g. octachlorodibenzo-p-dioxin) are, however, so poorly soluble that this hinders their bioaccumulation. Bioaccumulation is followed by biomagnification. Lipid-soluble compounds are first accumulated to microscopic organisms such as phytoplankton, which are then consumed by zooplankton, this by invertebrates such as insects, these by small fish, and further by large fish and seals. At every stage or trophic level, the concentration is higher, because the persistent chemicals are not "burned off" when the higher organism uses the fat of the prey organism to produce energy.

Due to bioaccumulation and biomagnification, the species at the top of the trophic pyramid are most vulnerable to dioxin-like compounds. In Europe, the white-tailed eagle and some species of seals have approached extinction due to poisoning by persistent organic pollutants. Likewise, in America, the population of bald eagles declined because of POPs causing thinning of eggshells and other reproductive problems. Usually, the failure has been attributed mostly to DDT, but dioxins are also a possible cause of reproductive effects. In both America and in Europe, many waterfowl have high concentrations of dioxins, but usually not high enough to disturb their reproductive success. Due to supplementary winter feeding and other measures, the white-tailed eagle is recovering (see white-tailed eagle). Also, ringed seals in the Baltic Sea are recovering.

Humans are also at the top of the trophic pyramid, particularly newborns. Exclusively-breastfed newborns were estimated to be exposed to a total of 800 pg TEQ/day, leading to an estimated body weight-based dose of 242 pg TEQ/kg/day. Due to a multitude of food sources, for adult humans exposure is much less, averaging at 1 pg TEQ/kg-day, and dioxin concentrations in adults are much less at 10–100 pg/g, compared with 9000 to 340,000 pg/g (TEQ in lipid) in eagles or seals feeding almost exclusively on fish.

Because of different physicochemical properties, not all congeners of dioxin-like compounds find their routes to human beings equally well. Measured as TEQs, the dominant congeners in human tissues are 2,3,7,8-TCDD, 1,2,3,7,8-PeCDD, 1,2,3,6,7,8-HxCDD, and 2,3,4,7,8-PeCDF. This is very different from most sources, where hepta- and octa-congeners may predominate. The WHO panel re-evaluating the TEF values in 2005 expressed their concern that emissions should not be uncritically measured as TEQs, because not all congeners are equally important. They stated that "when a human risk assessment is to be done from abiotic matrices, factors such as fate, transport, and bioavailability from each matrix be specifically considered".

All POPs are poorly water-soluble, especially dioxins. Therefore, groundwater contamination has not been a problem, even in cases of severe contamination due to the main chemicals such as chlorophenols. In surface waters, dioxins are bound to organic and inorganic particles.

==== Remediation research ====
TCDD has long been known to be sensitive to photochemical dechlorination. If exposed to direct sunlight or UV radiation, it will decompose in a matter of hours. Photocatalysis and other methods have also been tested in attempts to remove dioxins in soils and other environments. Because dioxins adsorb tightly to soil particles, and microbial degradation (mostly via dehalogenation, Dehalococcoides CBDB1 being an example) of dioxins is very slow, researchers have tried to search for mechanisms to increase degradation or to find especially active microbial species for the purposes of bioremediation. By and large, this has not been very successful. In addition, interactions with the animal gut microbiomes are poorly known.

=== Sources of human exposure ===
The most important source of human exposure is fatty food of animal origin (see §Human intake, above), and breast milk. There is much variation between different countries as to the most important items. In the US and Central Europe, milk, dairy products, and meat have been by far the most important sources. In some countries, notably Finland and to some extent Sweden, fish is important due to contaminated Baltic fish and very low intake from any other sources. In most countries, a significant decrease of dioxin intake has occurred due to stricter controls during the last 20 years.

Historically, occupational exposure to dioxins has been a major problem. Dioxins are formed as important toxic side products in the production of PCBs, chlorophenols, chlorophenoxy acid herbicides, and other chlorinated organic chemicals. This caused very high exposures to workers in poorly-controlled hygienic conditions. Many workers had chloracne. In a NIOSH study in the US, the average concentration of TCDD in exposed persons was 233 ng/kg (in serum lipid) while it was 7 ng/kg in unexposed workers, even though the exposure had been 15–37 years earlier. This indicates a huge previous exposure. In fact the exact back-calculation is debated, and the concentrations may have been even several times higher than originally estimated.

Handling and spraying of chlorophenoxy acid herbicides may also cause quite high exposures, as clearly demonstrated by the users of Agent Orange in the Malayan Emergency and in the Vietnam War. The highest concentrations were detected in nonflying enlisted personnel (e.g. filling the tanks of planes), although the variation was huge, 0 to 618 ng/kg TCDD (mean 23.6 ng/kg). Other occupational exposures (working at paper and pulp mills, steel mills, and incinerators) have been remarkably lower.

Accidental exposures have been huge in some cases. The highest concentrations in people after the Seveso accident were 56,000 ng/kg, and the highest exposure ever recorded was found in Austria in 1998, 144,000 ng/kg (see TCDD). This is equivalent to a dose of 20 to 30 μg/kg TCDD, a dose that would be lethal to guinea pigs and some rat strains.

Exposure from contaminated soil is possible when dioxins are blown up in dust, or children eat soil. Inhalation was clearly demonstrated in Missouri in the 1970s, when waste oils were used as dust suppressant in horse arenas. Many horses and other animals were killed due to poisoning. Dioxins are neither volatile nor water-soluble, and therefore exposure of human beings depends on direct eating of soil or production of dust which carries the chemical. Contamination of groundwater or breathing vapour of the chemical are not likely to cause a significant exposure. Currently, in the US, there are 126 Superfund sites with a completed exposure pathway contaminated with dioxins.

Further, PCBs are known to pass through treatment plants and accumulate in sludge which is used on farm fields in certain countries. In 2011 in South Carolina, SCDHEC enacted emergency sludge regulations after PCBs were found to have been discharged to a waste-treatment plant.

PCBs are also known to flush from industry and land (sludge fields) to contaminate fish, as they have up and down the Catawba River in North and South Carolina. State authorities have posted fish consumption advisories due to accumulation of PCBs in fish tissue.

There have been several food contamination episodes; one of the best known occurred in Belgium in 1999. A tank of recycled fats collected for animal feed production was contaminated by PCB oil containing about 1 g of dioxins and 2 g of DL-PCBs. This caused a major alarm in the European Union, but due to relatively fast response and slow accumulation of dioxins in humans, there were no health impacts. There was a similar incidence in Ireland in 2008. In 2008, Chile experienced a pork crisis caused by high dioxin concentrations in their pork exports. The contamination was found to be due to zinc oxide used in pork feed, and caused reputational and financial losses for the country, as well as leading to the introduction of new food-safety regulations. These episodes emphasize the importance of food control, and early detection guarantees that very-slowly-accumulating dioxins do not increase in humans to levels causing toxic effects.
