= Sharon Beder =

Australian academic

- Born: 1956 (age 69–70); Wellington, New Zealand
- Occupation: Environmentalist

Sharon Beder is an environmentalist and former professor in the Faculty of Arts at the University of Wollongong in New South Wales, Australia. Her research has focused on how power relationships are maintained and challenged, particularly by corporations and professions. She has written 11 books, and many articles, book chapters and conference papers, as well as designing teaching resources and educational websites.

== Early life and family ==
Beder was born in 1956 in Wellington, New Zealand, granddaughter of Jewish immigrants from Scotland, England and eastern Europe, before the second world war, and daughter of Jacqui and Yoss Beder.

== Education ==
Beder initially trained and worked as a civil engineer in New Zealand before becoming interested in the social, political and philosophical aspects of engineering and then environmental politics. She completed a PhD in Science and Technology Studies at the University of New South Wales in 1989 based on research into the process of engineering decision-making using a case study on the development of Sydney's sewerage system.

== Appointments ==
Before joining the University of Wollongong in 1992, Beder was Environmental Education Co-ordinator at the University of Sydney. She has also been Chairperson of the Environmental Engineering Branch of the Institution of Engineers, Sydney, President of the Society for Social Responsibility in Engineering, and a director of the Earth Foundation Australia.

== Awards ==
Beder was included in a list of "Australia's most influential engineers", published by Engineers Australia in 2004. She was also included in Bulletin Magazine's "Smart 100" in 2003. Her awards include:

- High Commendation for IEAust Award for Cultural Change in Engineering Education, 1998
- Michael Daley Prize for Excellence in Science, Technology and Engineering Journalism, 1992
- Commonwealth Postgraduate Award, 1985-1988

=== Books ===
- Beder, Sharon. (1989). Toxic Fish and Sewer Surfing. (Allen & Unwin, Sydney)
- Beder, Sharon. (1996). The Nature of Sustainable Development. (Scribe Publications, Melbourne)
- Beder, Sharon. (1998). The New Engineer: Management and Professional Responsibility in a Changing World. (Macmillan, Melbourne)
- Beder, Sharon. (1997). Global Spin: The Corporate Assault on Environmentalism (Green Books, Devon, UK, October 1997, 2nd edition – May 2002, ISBN 1-903998-09-3)
- Beder, Sharon (2000). Selling the work ethic: From puritan pulpit to corporate PR. Australia: Scribe Publications. ISBN 0-908011-48-2.
- Beder, Sharon (2003). Power Play: The fight for control of the world's electricity. Australia: Scribe Publications. ISBN 0-908011-97-0.
- Beder, Sharon. (2006). Environmental Principles and Policies (UNSW Press, Sydney, Australia Paperback, ISBN 978-0-86840-857-6, Publication date: September 2006) & EARTHSCAN, London, UK Paperback, ISBN 978-1-84407-404-4, Publication date: October 2006).
- Beder, Sharon. (2006). Suiting Themselves: How Corporations Drive the Global Agenda. (Earthscan, London)
- Beder, Sharon. (2006). Free Market Missionaries: The Corporate Manipulation of Community Values. (Earthscan, London)
- Beder, Sharon. (2009). This Little Kiddy Went to Market: The Corporate Capture of Childhood. (Pluto Press, London)
- Beder, Sharon. (2022). Nellie-Roo: The Orphan Joey. (Wildlife Storybooks)

== See also ==
- Dioxin controversy
- Marine Outfall
- Deregulation
