= Occupational hazards of fire debris cleanup =

Potential health and safety effects of working in fire affected zones

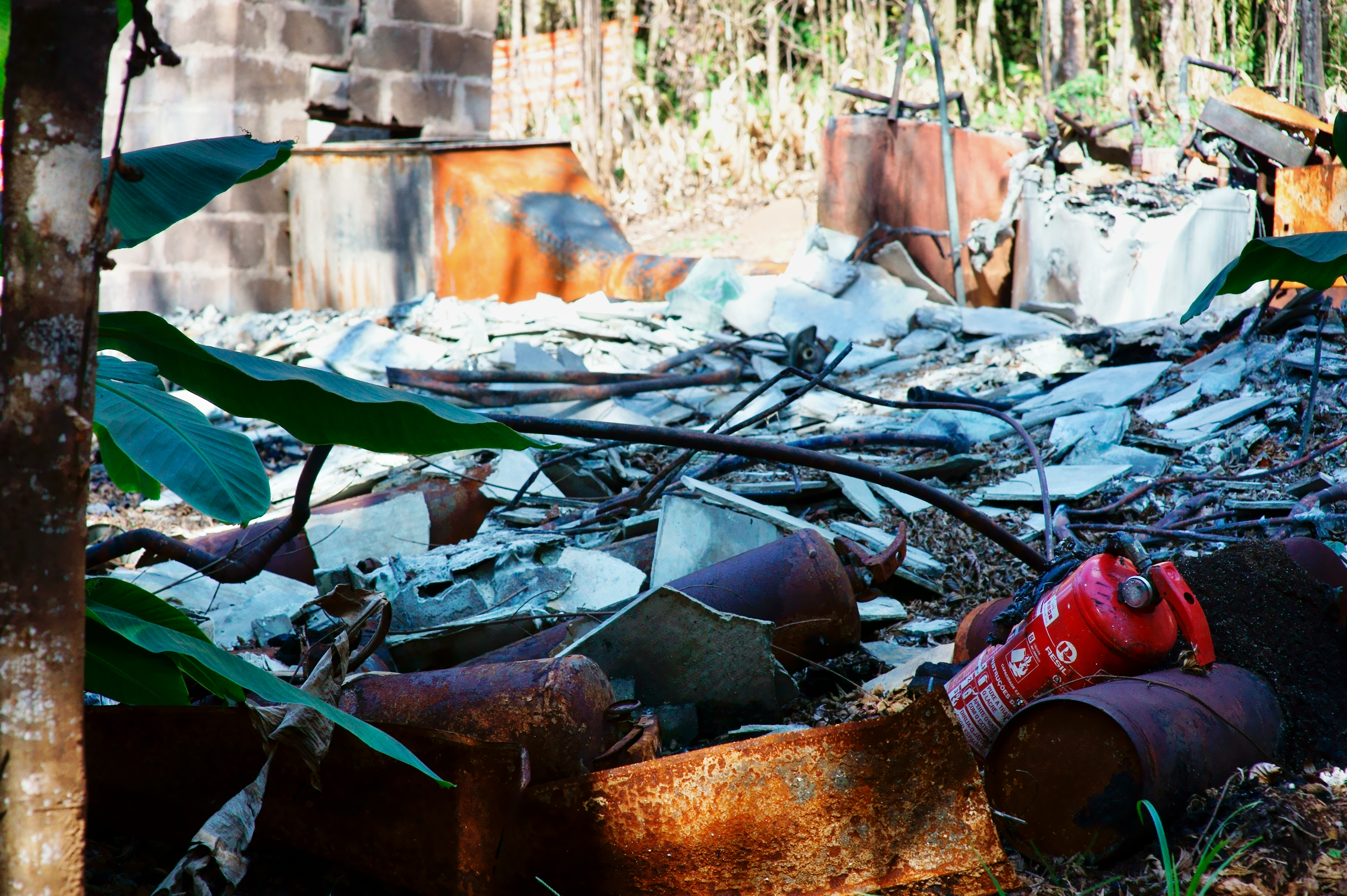

Occupational hazards of fire debris cleanup are the hazards to health and safety of the personnel tasked with clearing the area of debris and combustion products after a conflagration. Once extinguished, fire debris cleanup poses several safety and health risks for workers. Employers responsible for fire debris cleanup and other work in areas damaged or destroyed by fire are generally obliged by occupational safety and health legislation of the relevant national or regional authority to identify and evaluate hazards, correct any unsafe or unhealthy conditions and provide any necessary training and instruction and personal protective equipment to employees to enable them to carry out the task without undue exposure to hazards. Many of the approaches to control risk in occupational settings can be applied to preventing injuries and disease. This type of work can be completed by general construction firms who may not be fully trained specifically for fire safety and on fire hazards.

Asbestos, which has well known health risks, is still quite commonly found in older buildings, and there are also risks from degraded roofing tiles, melted metals and electronics, unstable structures, and the sooty residues from burnt materials. Silica, one of the most common compounds on earth, can cause adverse health consequences if inhaled as fine particulates. Many combustion products are carcinogenic, particularly when inhaled as dusts.

== Hazards ==
=== Safety ===
Safety hazards of fire cleanup include the risk of re-ignition of smoldering debris, electrocution from downed or exposed electrical lines or in instances where water has come into contact with electrical equipment. Structures that have been burned may be unstable and at risk of sudden collapse. Other safety hazards may include flammable gases (i.e., propane) and gas storage tanks, tree work, confined spaces, sharp or flying objects, and heat related illnesses.

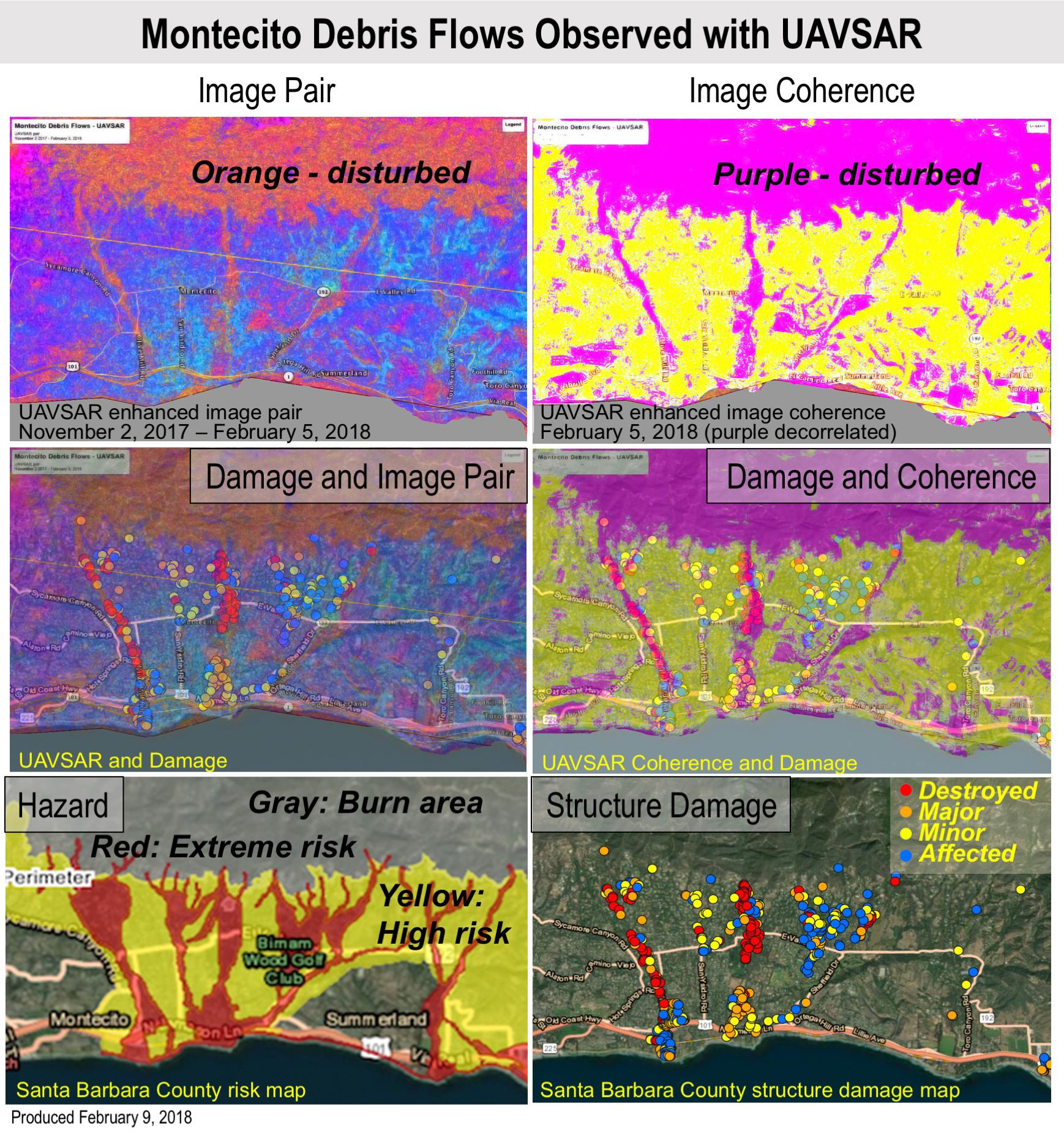
Thomas Fire in Ventura and Santa Barbara debris flows, before and after images. Taken with NASA's (UAVSAR) the images shows the effect of the debris flows

Wildfire cleanup includes the safety hazards of other fires and the additional risk of flash floods or debris flows. Flash floods and debris flows can occur without a burned area, but after a fire, the risk is much higher. The soil of a burned area can become much more water-repellent, making areas downhill and downstream of the burned area much more susceptible to flash floods or debris flows. The amount of rainfall needed and the slope of the incline determine the severity, but in general, if the area is downhill from a burned area, there is a risk of flash flooding or debris flows. The risk of flash floods and debris flows after a wildfire can last from two to five years, depending on the severity of the fire, the slope of the incline, and the amount of rainfall in the region. Regrowth and reduced water repellency should start recovering after two years, which should start to reduce the risk.

=== Hazardous substances ===
Hazardous substances are a common danger when cleaning up after a fire. Hazardous substances are found at fire cleanup sites from ash, undamaged material, gasses, and airborne particles. The following substances can be found at a fire cleanup site from ash, char, soot, smoke, debris, or in raw form.

Burned residential areas may contain silica dust, asbestos, metals, or polyaromatic hydrocarbons, especially if older housing structures are involved. Commercial/industrial structures that house hazardous materials onsite may also continue to have the original materials or their combustion byproducts but may be released outside the original structure. Additional health hazards of fire debris cleanup work may include carbon monoxide and hazardous liquids

Silica, or silicon dioxide, can occur in a crystalline or noncrystalline (amorphous) form. In fire debris, silica can be found in concrete, roofing tiles, or it may be a naturally occurring element in the rocks and soil of the burnt out areas.

Asbestos was frequently used in building material in the past. It is a name given to a group of six different fibrous minerals (Amosite, Chrysotile, Crocidolite, and the fibrous varieties of Tremolite, Actinolite, and Anthophyllite). Inhalation of asbestos can result in various diseases including asbestosis, lung cancer, and mesothelioma.

In fire debris clean up, sources of metals exposure include burnt or melted electronics, cars, refrigerators, stoves, etc. These metals can melt and be found in residential fire debris. Fire debris cleanup workers may be exposed to these metals or their combustion products in the air or on their skin. These metals may include beryllium, cadmium, chromium, cobalt, lead, manganese, nickel, and many more.

Polycyclic aromatic hydrocarbons (PAHs), some of which are carcinogenic, come from the incomplete combustion of organic materials and are often found as a result of structural and wildland fires.

Hazardous substance	Health risks	Potential sources
Arsenic	Carcinogen that can cause Cancer, may induce vomiting, and can damage nerves, skin, or the Circulatory system.	Arsenic treated wood, Semiconductor, food.
Asbestos	Inhalation can result in Asbestosis, Mesothelioma, or lung cancer.	Used in many older building materials, so it can be found in large quantities in older buildings.
Beryllium	Inhalation or skin contact can result in Berylliosis (CBD), lung cancer, or beryllium sensitization.	Minor component found in computer electronics.
Cadmium	Carcinogen that can cause cancer, or may cause lung or bone damage.	Plating, Pigment, Nickel–cadmium battery, and Plastic. Airborne cadmium can come from burning plastics, Coal and Fossil fuel.
Chromium	Inhalation or contact can lead to Occupational asthma, eye irritation, liver damage, pulmonary congestion or edema, and it is a carcinogen.	Minor component in consumer electronics and stainless steel
Cobalt	Inhalation can cause breathing difficulty, and long term damage to your nose, throat and lungs. Physical exposure can cause blood and thyroid issues, or skin irritation and discoloration.	Minor component in consumer electronics
Lead	Can damage almost every part of the body, but the brain and kidneys are most at risk.	Older paints, pipes, lead-glazed ceramics and porcelains, many consumer products, and more.
Manganese	Lung damage, brain damage, or liver damage.	Paints, some batteries, and steelmaking. Manganese is a crucial component in the steelmaking process, so there is a high likelihood it will be found at a steelmaking mill fire cleanup site.
Nickel	Carcinogen that can cause cancer, vomiting, headaches, dizziness, skin damage, or lung damage.	Metal, jewelry, appliances, batteries, and coinage.
Zinc	Contact can irritate the skin and the eyes. Inhalation can irritate the throat and the nose.	Food, electronics, paints, and ceramics
Polycyclic aromatic hydrocarbons (PAHs)	Carcinogen that can cause cancer, kidney damage, liver damage, respiratory issues, and weaken the immune system.	Byproducts of burning coal, gas and organic substances. They are commonly found in soot.
Polychlorinated biphenyls (PCBs)	Nausea, vomiting, weakened immune system, nervous system damage.	Even though PCBs were banned in the US in 1979 and internationally in 2001, they can still be found in transformers, capacitors, cable insulation, fiberglass, felt, corks, adhesives, oil based paints, plastics, and older electronics.
Polybrominated biphenyls (PBBs)	Rashes, nervous system damage, liver damage, kidney damage.	Fire retardant in plastics, wide ranges of older consumer goods.
Silicon dioxide (silica)	Silicosis, lung cancer, pulmonary disease, airway diseases.	Concrete, roof tiles, naturally occurring rocks and soil.

== Hazard controls ==
Standard personal protective equipment for fire cleanup include hard hats, goggles or safety glasses, heavy work gloves, earplugs or other hearing protection, steel-toe boots, and fall protection devices.

Hazard controls for electrical injury include assuming all power lines are energized until the power provider confirms they are de-energized, and grounding power lines on both the load- and supply-sides of the work area to guard against electrical feedback if a portable generator is turned on elsewhere in the power grid. Appropriate personal protective equipment includes rubber gloves, dielectric overshoes, and insulated sticks and cable cutters.

Proper respiratory protection can protect against hazardous substances. Proper ventilation of an area is an engineering control that can be used to avoid or minimize exposure to hazardous substances. When ventilation is insufficient or dust cannot be avoided, personal protective equipment such as N95 respirators can be used.

== Risk assessment ==
Before authorizing cleanup work by employees, the employer may be legally obliged to assess the risks to health and safety of the intended work, and provide appropriate instructions, training and personal protective equipment to the employees. Adequate risk assessment involves consideration of all known, reasonably predictable, and suspected hazards, including full disclosure of known hazards by the client in cases where a contractor is taken on to do the work. Details of this obligation will depend on the national or state legislation relevant to the locality.

== See also ==
- Firefighting – Actions to prevent damage from fire
- Firefighter – Rescuer trained to extinguish fires and save people
- Wildfire suppression
- Occupational safety and health
- OSHA
- National Institute for Occupational Safety and Health
- Personal protective equipment
- Fire prevention
- Fire safety
