= Tolerable weekly intake =

Tolerable weekly intake (TWI) estimates the amount per unit body weight of a potentially harmful substance or contaminant in food or water that can be ingested over a lifetime without risk of adverse health effects. TWI is generally preceded by "provisional" to indicate insufficient data exists, increasing uncertainty. The term TWI should be reserved for when there is a well-established and internationally accepted tolerance, backed by sound and uncontested data. Although similar in concept to tolerable daily intake (TDI), which is of the same derivation of acceptable daily intakes (ADIs), TWI accounts for contaminants that do not clear the body quickly and may accumulate within the body over a period of time. An example is heavy metals such as arsenic, cadmium, lead, and mercury. The concept of TWI takes into account daily variations in human consumption patterns.

== Background ==
Governments and international organizations such as the Joint FAO/WHO Expert Committee on Food Additives (JECFA), the Joint FAO/WHO Meeting on Pesticide Residues (JMPR), the World Health Organization (WHO) and the Food and Agriculture Organization of the United Nations (FAO) generally use the safety factor approach, based on ADI, to determine intake tolerances for substances that exhibit thresholds for toxicity. The Codex Alimentarius Commission, with the help of independent international risk assessment bodies or ad-hoc consultations organized by FAO and WHO, develops and publishes tolerances based on the best available science. After identifying a substance of concern, researchers and experts then study information the substance's metabolism by humans and animals (as appropriate), the substance's toxicokinetics and toxicodynamics (including carry-over of the toxic substance from feed to edible animal tissue/products); and the substance's acute and long term toxicity in order to determine the acceptability and safety of intake levels of the substance. In comparison to TWI, the Codex maximum level (ML) for a food is the maximum concentration of that substance recommended by the Codex Alimentarius Commission (CAC) to be legally permitted in that commodity.

== Data sources ==
1. The JECFA makes a distinction between acceptable intakes and tolerable intakes. Tolerable is used to demonstrate permissibility, not acceptability. Substances such as food additives, veterinary drugs, and pesticides that can be controlled in the food supply relatively easily are assessed an acceptable daily intake, or ADI. Other substances considered contaminants are assessed a tolerable daily or weekly intake, TDI or TWI, respectively. Tolerable intakes, whether daily, weekly, or monthly, should not be confused with reference daily intake, or RDI. RDI refers to the amount of a given nutrient individuals should uptake to maintain health.
2. When determining TWI, appropriate safety factors are applied to allow for extrapolation of human no-observed-adverse-effect levels (NOAELs). NOAELs are established by toxicological studies in animals, and the appropriate safety factors are applied so human NOAELs can be extrapolated. For additives that have an observed effect, and it is not known whether or not the effect is negative, ADI is based on a no observed effect level, or NOEL. To determine the NOEL, researchers primarily use animals (the species most sensitive to the treatments) and carefully select doses until they determine the highest dose that presents an adverse (toxic, but not deadly) effect not observed in lowest dose. When adverse effects predominate, the JMPR bases the ADI on the NOAELs. Uncertainty factors are applied to account for intra- and inter-species differences.

== Calculations ==
Tolerable intake is usually expressed in micrograms or milligrams per kilogram of body weight. Intake (exposure) is determined using the following formula:

Exposure = Σ_{i} (consumption)_{i} x (concentration)_{i} / Body Weight
