= Octachlorodibenzodioxin =

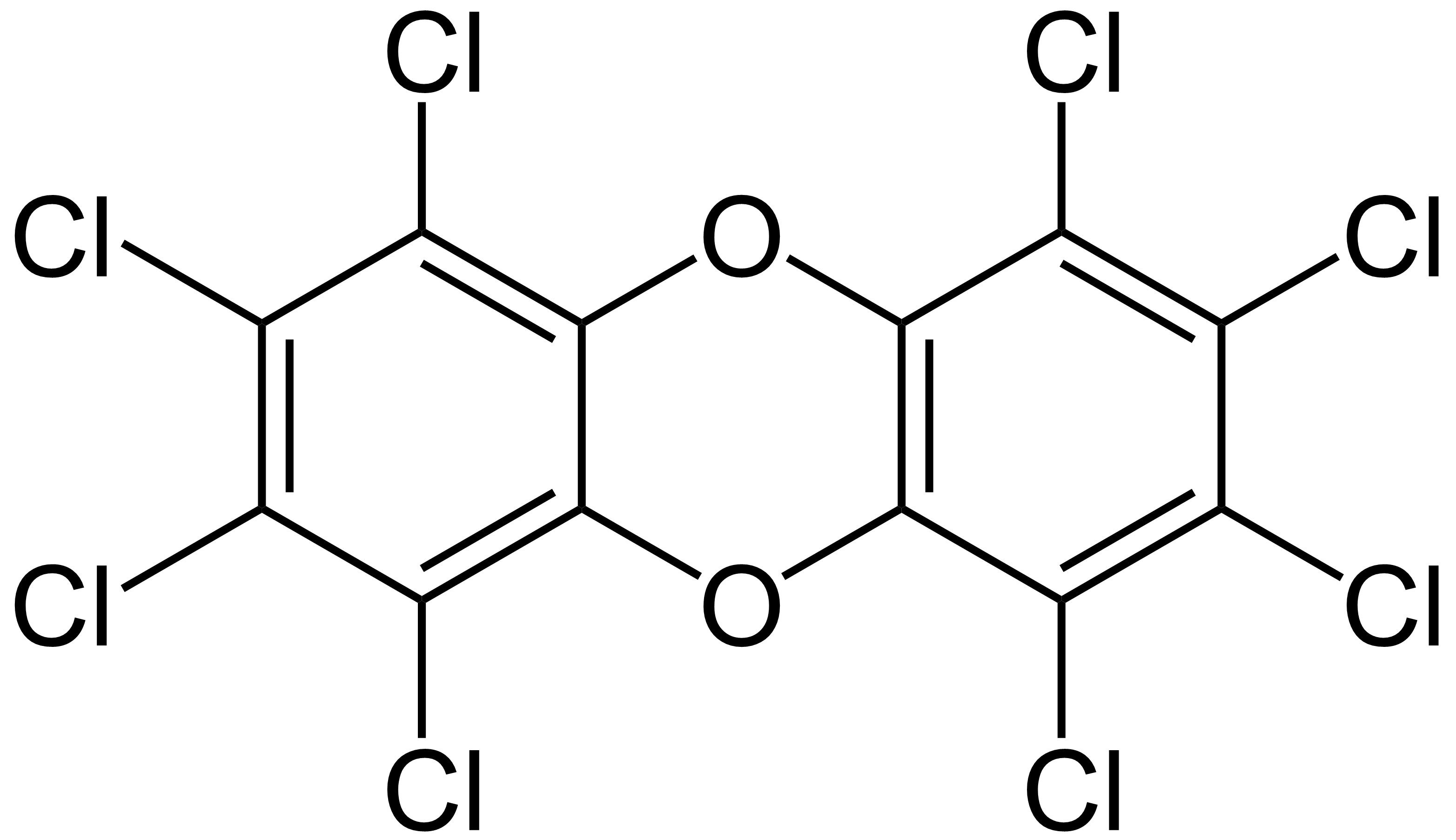
- Skeletal formula

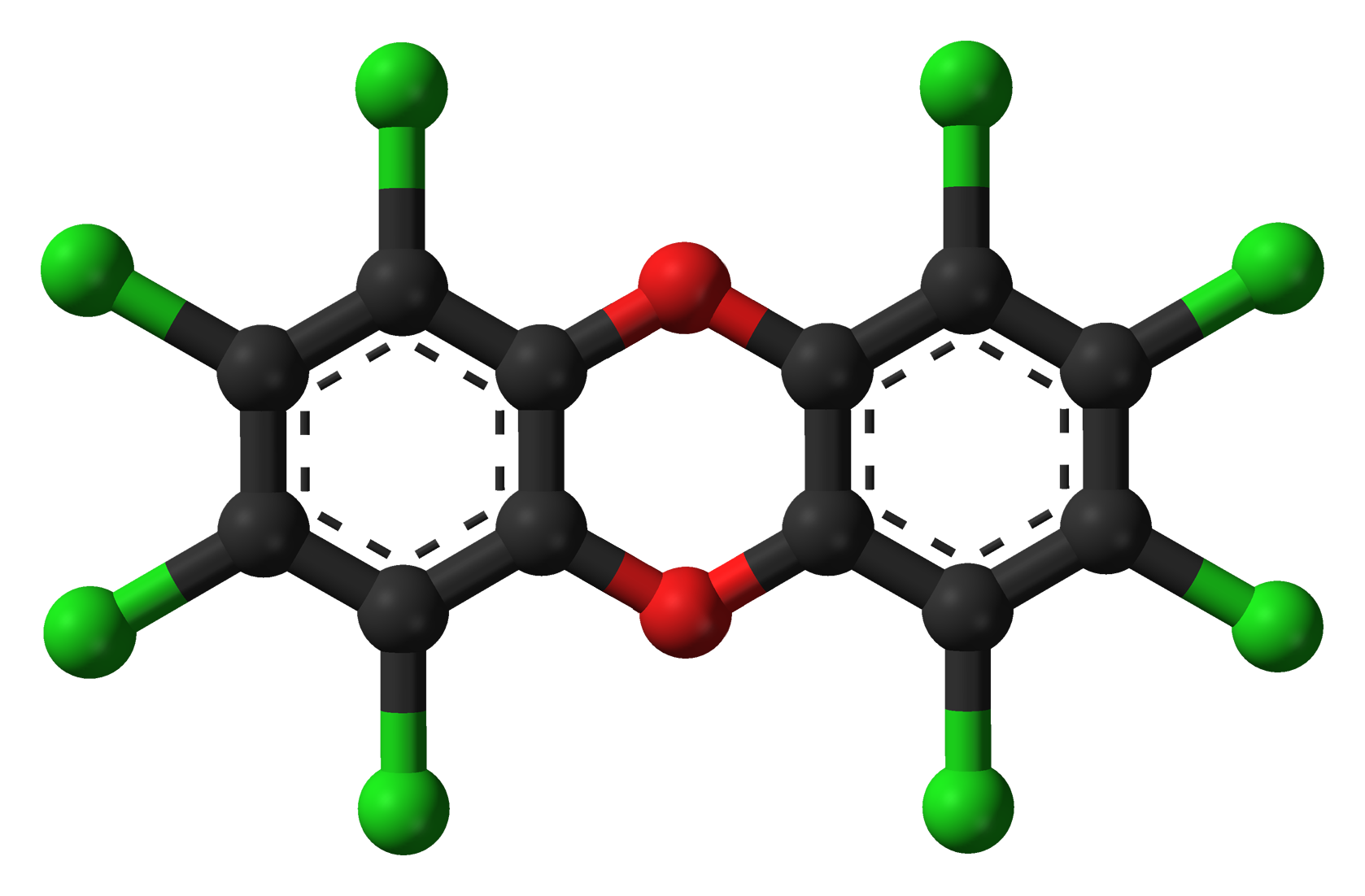
- Ball-and-stick model

Names
- Preferred IUPAC name Octachlorooxanthrene
- Other names OCDD, Octachlorodibenzo-p-dioxin

Identifiers
CAS Number	3268-87-9
3D model (JSmol)	Interactive image
ChEBI	CHEBI:81566
ChEMBL	ChEMBL136461
ChemSpider	17598
ECHA InfoCard	100.223.031
EC Number	694-813-3
KEGG	C18180
PubChem CID	18636
UNII	YW59P10266
UN number	2811 (OCTACHLORODIBENZO-P-DIOXIN)
CompTox Dashboard (EPA)	DTXSID4025799
- InChI: InChI=1S/C12Cl8O2/c13-1-2(14)6(18)10-9(5(1)17)21-11-7(19)3(15)4(16)8(20)12(11)22-10 Key: FOIBFBMSLDGNHL-UHFFFAOYSA-N
- SMILES: ClC1=C2C(OC(C(Cl)=C(Cl)C(Cl)=C3Cl)=C3O2)=C(Cl)C(Cl)=C1Cl

Properties
Chemical formula	C_{12}Cl_{8}O_{2}
Molar mass	459.73 g·mol^{−1}

Hazards
- Occupational safety and health (OHS/OSH)
Main hazards	liver damage, chloracne
- GHS labelling
Pictograms	(GHS06: Toxic) (GHS09: Environmental hazard)
Signal word	Danger
Hazard statements	H300, H410
Precautionary statements	P264, P270, P273, P301+P316, P321, P330, P391, P405, P501

Related compounds
Related Polychlorinated dibenzodioxins	Tetrachlorodibenzodioxin
- Except where otherwise noted, data are given for materials in their standard state (at 25 °C [77 °F], 100 kPa). verify (what is ?) Infobox references

Octachlorodibenzodioxin (abbreviated as OCDD or OctaCDD) is one of polychlorinated dibenzodioxins (PCDDs). When compared to 2,3,7,8-tetrachlorodibenzodioxin (TCDD), its toxicity is about 3000 times weaker.

It is one of the dominant PCDD congeners in smoke emissions, but because it is much less soluble than TCDD, it is not bioaccumulated as effectively and it is toxicologically less important than the most prevalent dioxins. (For details see Dioxins and dioxin-like compounds).

Chlorinated pesticides can also contain impurities of polychlorinated dibenzodioxins and polychlorinated dibenzofurans (PCDD/Fs) and their precursors. "Precursor formation of PCDD/Fs can also be mediated by ultraviolet light (UV)" from sun (OCDD mostly). Changes in congeners ratio after UV exposition suggest that pesticide sources of dioxines-like after sunlight exposure "may not be recognized based on matching source fingerprints established from manufacturing impurities. These changes also provide preliminary insights into the possible formation routes and types of precursors involved".
