= C4H7ClO =

The molecular formula C_{4}H_{7}ClO may refer to:

- Butyryl chloride, an organic compound with the chemical formula CH_{3}CH_{2}CH_{2}C(O)Cl
- Isobutyryl chloride, the simplest branched-chain acyl chloride
