= Alkyl ketene dimer =

Class of chemical compounds

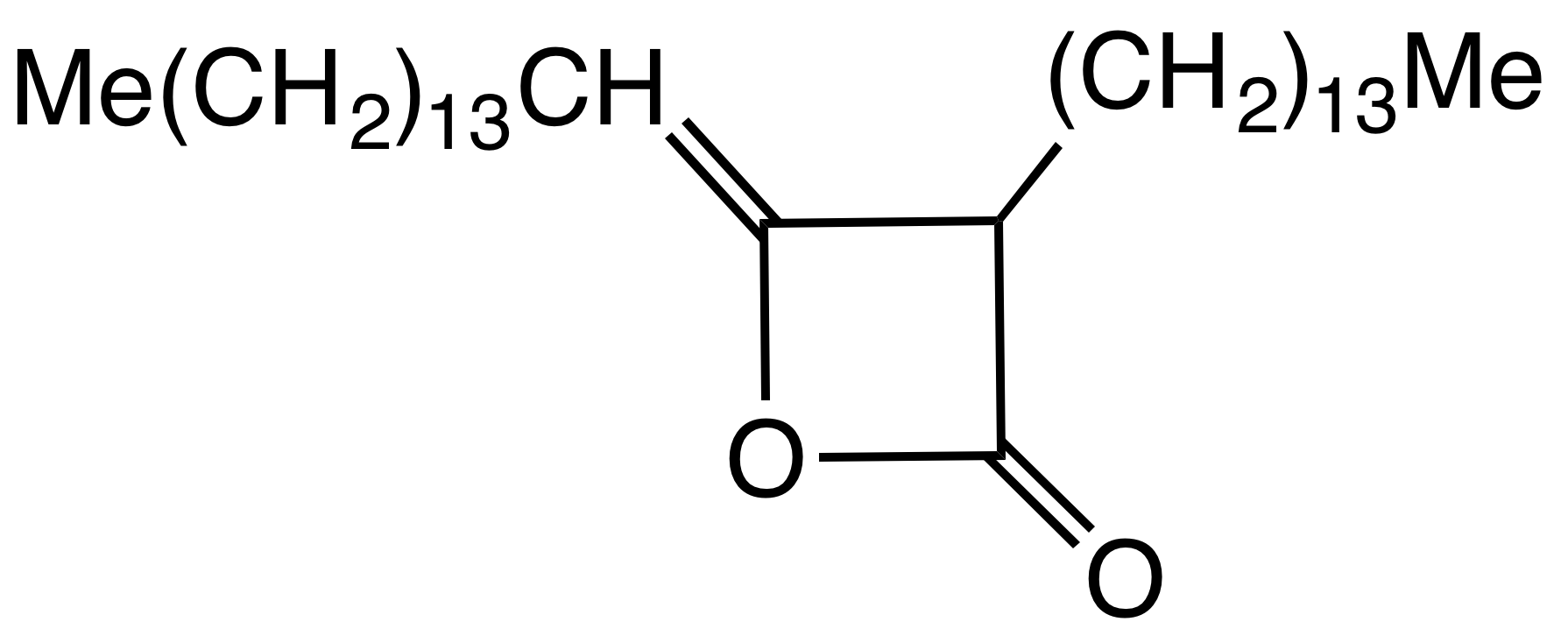
Structure of the AKD derived from palmitic acid

Alkyl ketene dimers (AKDs) are a family of organic compounds based on the 4-membered ring system of oxetan-2-one, which is also the central structural element of propiolactone and diketene. Attached to the oxetane ring of technically relevant alkyl ketene dimers there is a C_{12} – C_{16} alkyl group in the 3-position and a C_{13} – C_{17} alkylidene group in the 4-position.

The main application of alkylated ketene dimers is in the sizing of paper and cardboard, as well as in the hydrophobation of cellulose fibers. The products thus modified are distinguished by higher mechanical strengths and less penetration of water, inks or printing inks.

AKD's feature hydrophobic alkyl groups extending from a beta-propiolactone ring. A specific example is derived from the dimerization of the ketene of stearic acid. This ketene is generated by pyrolysis of stearoyl chloride. AKD's react with the hydroxyl groups on the cellulose via esterification reaction. The esterification is competitive with hydrolysis of the AKD. Prior to the development of AKD's, hydrophobicity was imparted by incorporating rosin into the paper.

Related to AKDs, is alkenylsuccinic anhydride (ASA). As for AKDs, ASA reacts with hydroxy groups of the cellulose to form an ester, anchoring the hydrophobic group to the surface. ASA is prepared by the ene reaction of unsaturated hydrocarbons with maleic anhydride.

== History ==
In 1901, Edgar Wedekind published the synthesis of alkyl ketene dimers by the reaction of acyl chlorides with tertiary amines:

RCH_{2}COCl + R_{3}N → RCH=C=O + R_{3}NHCl

The molecular weight determined by the early researchers indicated ((CH_{3})_{2}CH=C=O)_{n} where n > 1 for the dehydrohalogenation of isobutyryl chloride with triethylamine.

Alternative structures for dimerisation products

The primary reaction products of acid chlorides with hydrogen atoms in α-position and tertiary amines were identified by Hermann Staudinger and Norman Thomas Mortimer Wilsmore as highly reactive ketenes (ethenones), which form 2-oxetanones with an alkylidene group when dimerizing in a [2+2] photocycloadditions.

Staudinger's insight was complicated by dependence of the dimerization on substituents. The simple ketene (H_{2}C=C=O) dimerizes to diketene (4-methylen-oxetan-2-one), while substituted ketenes, such as dimethyl ketene (Me_{2}C=C=O, formed from isobutyryl chloride with triethylamine) dimerize in a head-to-tail addition to 2,2,4,4-tetramethylcyclobutanedione.

Dimerisation from dimethylketene to tetramethyl-1,3-cyclobutanedione

The 2,2,4,4,4-tetramethylcyclobutanedione can easily be isomerized to dimethyl ketene dimer (4-isopropylidene-3,3-dimethyl-oxetan-2-one).

The synthesis and characterization of hexadecyl ketene dimer, a key substance for alkylated ketene dimers was first described in a patent in 1945 and in a publication in 1947.

== Preparation ==
The industrial synthesis of alkylated ketenedimers (at that time still called ketoethenones) was patented in 1945 from long-chain carboxylic acid chlorides in inert solvents (such as diethyl ether or benzene) with triethylamine as tertiary amine under anhydrous conditions. After filtration of the insoluble triethylamine hydrochloride and evaporation of the solvent, long-chain alkyl chain dimers are obtained in yields of more than 90%.

Synthesis of C_{18}-AKD from Stearoyl chloride

The use of other solvents, such as carboxylic acid esters or ketones for easier separation of trialkylamine hydrochlorides or other amines, such as N,N,N',N'-tetramethyl-hexane-1,6-diamine does not provide any significant advantages.

Also processes without the solvent use are described, in which the resulting amine hydrochloride is either filtered off or extracted with diluted aqueous acids.

A continuous process in which long-chain carboxylic acid chloride and tertiary amine (e. g. dimethyl isopropylamine, dimethylcyclohexylamine or triethylamine) is supplied separately without solvents to a tube reactor, kneader or preferably a twin-screw extruder or planetary roller extruder and reacted at temperatures between 90 and 110 °C, delivers lactone contents of over 90% at short reaction times. Processing is carried out by phase separation or acidic extraction.

== Use ==
=== Alkylated ketene dimers as paper sizing agents ===
The problems with the acidic (aluminum sulfate-mediated) mass sizing of paper with alkaline-digested colophony resins introduced since the early 19th century led besides the use of alkaline flocculants (such as chalk or calcium carbonate as the alkali reserve) to the search for alternative materials for sizing in a neutral or alkaline environment. In addition to the significantly more reactive alkenylsuccinic anhydrides (which do also hydrolyze rapidly in the presence of water) alkylated ketene dimers have begun to be preferred surface and mass sizes in the paper industry from the 1960s onwards, beginning in the 1950s.

Structural formula of a C_{18}-alkenylsuccinic anhydride (ASA)

Industrially applied AKDs are derived from fatty acids with chain lengths between C14 (myristic acid) to C22 (behenic acid); palmityl (C16) diketene and stearyl (C18) ketene and mixtures thereof are preferably used, as well as fatty acid mixtures from the hydrolysis of animal and vegetable fats. Because of the chain length of the original fatty acids, AKD are waxy solids with melting points between 42 and about 70 °C. Mixtures of alkylated ketene dimers and water are dispersions at temperatures below 40 °C or emulsions at temperatures above 45 °C. Liquid AKD are not widely used, they are based on unsaturated fatty acids like oleic acid or branched fatty acids, like isostearic acid.

Aqueous alkyldiketene dispersions generally contain 10-20 wt% of AKD, as well as active protective colloids (particularly polycations such as cationic starch, copolymers of N-vinylpyrrolidone and quaternized N-vinylimidazole, acylated polyethyleneimines or cationic high molecular weight polyacrylamides with an average molar mass up to 7 million g/mol) and other stabilizers (usually anionic surfactants, for example ligninsulfonates or condensation products of naphthalenesulfonic acid sodium salt and formaldehyde). Such stabilized AKD dispersions are active and stable at room temperature for up to three months and also tolerate the addition of different fillers for paper or cardboard (e.g. kaolin, chalk, talc, titanium dioxide, calcium sulfate, aluminum oxide, etc.) from 5 to 25%. The amounts of alkyl ketene dimers used for the sizing of paper and paper products are preferably in the range from 0.15 to 0.8 wt%, sometimes from 0.05 to 0.2 wt%, based on the dry paper stock.

=== Paper sizing with alkylated ketene dimers ===
For paper sizing with AKD, a three-step process was proposed which, despite controversial discussions in the 1990s, seems to describe the processes that are taking place best and explains the results achieved. Decisive criteria for the quality of the hydrophobicity of papers are

1. the retention of the AKD particles on the wet paper mass on the paper screen
2. the spreading of the AKD particles on the surface and the penetration in the paper mass
3. the chemical reaction of the hydroxyl groups of the cellulose (esterification) with the alkylated ketene dimers to form beta-ketocarboxylic esters.

Reaction of alkyl ketene dimer (AKD) with Cellulose

The molecular structure (i.e. molar mass and cross-linking degree), the molar charge density of cationic groups, the exact dosage of the cationic polymer as a dispersion stabilizer and retention aid as well as keeping the other process parameters such as temperature, pH and residence times is crucial.

After removal of excess water - also to avoid hydrolysis of the AKD to the beta-keto acid and subsequent decarboxylation to the ketone -

Hydrolysis of alkyl ketene dimer to the beta-ketoacid followed by decarboxylation to the ketone

follows the cracking of the stabilized AKD particles on the base paper mass, the melting of the solid AKD wax (at approx. 90 °C), the spreading of the liquid AKD wax by surface diffusion on the cellulose fibers and the formation of closed hydrophobic layers. The thickness of the hydrophobic layers depends on the AKD concentration in the dispersion.

Ad 3. The hydrophobation of cellulose fibers with alkylated ketene dimers takes place most effectively in neutral or preferably weakly alkaline media (pH 7.5-9.0). The reaction temperature is generally 90-110 °C, with approximately 40% of the AKD used reacting with the cellulose. After the reaction contact angles of >100° are measured, indicating the hydrophobic character of the AKD-modified model surfaces. The esterification of hydroxyl groups of cellulose fibers was also demonstrated by comparison reactions with ^{14}C-labeled AKD.

The sizing with AKD is suitable for the permanent hydrophobation of newspaper, printing and writing paper and cardboard used as a container for liquids (including foodstuffs such as milk), as well as for the improvement of shape stability and runnability.

== Literature ==
- Roberts, J.C. (1996), J.C. Roberts (ed.), Paper Chemistry, 2nd Edition, London: Chapman & Hall, ISBN 978-0-7514-0236-0
- Johnson, D. (2009), I. Thorn, C.O. Au (ed.), Applications of Wet-End Paper Chemistry, 2nd Edition, Springer Netherlands, pp. 73–112, ISBN 978-1-4020-6037-3
