= 2,3,7,8-Tetrachlorodibenzofuran =

Names
- Preferred IUPAC name 2,3,7,8-Tetrachlorodibenzo[b,d]furan
- Other names: 2,3,7,8-Tetrachlorodibenzofuran; 2,3,7,8-Tetrapolychlorinated dibenzofuran

Identifiers
CAS Number	51207-31-9
3D model (JSmol)	Interactive image
ChEMBL	ChEMBL136710
ChemSpider	36507
ECHA InfoCard	100.223.045
KEGG	C18104
PubChem CID	39929
UNII	XZJ41GQI5D
CompTox Dashboard (EPA)	DTXSID3052147
- InChI: InChI=1S/C12H4Cl4O/c13-7-1-5-6-2-8(14)10(16)4-12(6)17-11(5)3-9(7)15/h1-4H Key: KSMVNVHUTQZITP-UHFFFAOYSA-N
- SMILES: ClC1=C(Cl)C=C2C(OC3=CC(Cl)=C(Cl)C=C23)=C1

Properties
Chemical formula	C_{12}H_{4}Cl_{4}O
Molar mass	305.96 g·mol^{−1}
Appearance	Colorless Crystals
Melting point	227 °C (441 °F; 500 K)
Solubility in water	6.92×10^{−7} mg/mL at 26 °C (79 °F; 299 K)

Hazards
- Lethal dose or concentration (LD, LC)
LD_{50} (median dose)	5–10 μg/kg (guinea pig, iv); >1 mg/kg (rat, iv); >6 mg/kg (mouse, iv); 1 mg/kg (monkey, iv)
- Except where otherwise noted, data are given for materials in their standard state (at 25 °C [77 °F], 100 kPa). Infobox references

2,3,7,8-Tetrachlorodibenzofuran (TCDF) is a polychlorinated dibenzofuran with a chemical formula of C_{12}H_{4}Cl_{4}O. TCDF is part of the chlorinated dibenzofuran (CDF) family that contains between 1 and 8 chlorine atoms attached to the parent dibenzofuran ring system. The CDF family includes 135 compounds, of which only a few have been studied.

TCDF was discovered in the mid-20th century along with other CDFs. It was found to be an unwanted by-product in the manufacturing of chlorinated compounds; it is not commercially used or produced itself. TCDF is directly released into the environment via emissions of waste incineration, fires of transformers with PCB oil, vehicle exhausts using leaded fuel, and bleaching of industrial products.

TCDF and other CDFs are known to have a lasting impact on the environment. It can exist as both a gas and as particles in the atmosphere, which results in deposition in the soil. It has an estimated half-life of around 60 days in the environment. The molecule can easily accumulate in the food chain, leading to potential human exposure. TCDF is listed as a hazardous air pollutant in the Clean Air Act of the 1990s. Monitoring programs are established to keep track of the levels on TCDF in various environmental compartments to avoid damaging ecosystems.

== Synthesis ==
TCDF is not purposefully manufactured. It is formed as a by-product of industrial manufacturing processes which place chlorine atoms in favorable reaction conditions, which include alkaline mediums, temperatures over 150 °C (302 °F), and exposure to UV light, or radical forming substances. In the production of chlorinated pesticides CDFs are formed as waste by-products by intermolecular condensation of ortho-chlorophenols. Intramolecular cyclization reactions of pre-dibenzofurans also result in CDFs. In thermal waste treatment processes CDFs are produced by combustion and pyrolysis of organochlorine or non-chlorinated organic compounds in the presence of chlorides. Recycling of metal cables can also lead to the formation of CDFs, as chlorine is formed by burning the insulator polyvinylchloride which causes formation of new CDFs. From PCBs, the production of CDFs can happen by the loss of two ortho chlorine atoms, loss of ortho as well as chlorine, loss of an ortho hydrogen and chlorine with an additional shift of chlorine from the 2 to 3 position, or loss of two ortho hydrogens.

== Available forms ==
TCDF is not made industrially and there are no commercial uses for it. TCDF is released into the air as vapour after during the burning of hazardous waste, fires involving PCB mixtures, and a byproduct of bleaching pulp. Some of this vapour remains in the air as particles, but some of it is deposited into the soil, as well as bodies of water. Most of the exposure and available forms is through the air, and the consumption of high-fat meat from animals that were exposed.

== Toxicity ==
TCDF is one of the most toxic congeners of the polychlorinated dibenzofurans. Its toxicity is associated with fatty liver disease. The toxicity of TCDF has been recorded mainly through testing of breast milk, adipose tissue, and blood serum. It is not yet classifiable as to its carcinogenicity to humans, but has been shown to cause cancer in some animals. It is therefore classified as an IARC group 3 chemical. Toxicity levels and baselines are not yet known in humans but are being tested on animals.

== Effects on animals ==
The recorded effects on animals are most commonly investigated in the house mouse, as well as male guinea pigs. Exposure to TCDF has led to problems in multiple organs within mice such as its liver, jejunum, cecum, small intestine, and large intestine. In general, the liver is the main target of TCDF, which leads to induced hepatic lipogenesis. When testing on female mice, the effects on embryos were recorded, showing that TCDF has the strongest effect on fetal kidneys and leads to 100% of fetuses to be at teratogenic toxicity levels which are not fatal for the mother. The exposure to TCDF leads to a decrease in glucose homeostasis leading to an abundance of glucose in the mouse body. It also promotes increased bile acid metabolic processes which lead to an increase in multiple acids such as deoxycholic acid, glycocholic acid, taurochenodeoxycholic acid, tauromuricholic acid, lithocholic acid, chenodeoxycholic acid, taurolithocholic acid, and an abundance of bile acids and salts. It affects the liver as it results in a positive regulation of lipid biosynthetic processes leading to an abundance of unsaturated fatty acids.

== Bibliography ==
- Ioannou, Y. M.; Birnbaum, L. S.; Matthews, H. B. (October 1983). "Toxicity and distribution of 2,3,7,8-tetrachlorodibenzofuran in male guinea pigs". Journal of Toxicology and Environmental Health. 12 (4–6): 541–553. Bibcode:1983JTEH...12..541I. doi:10.1080/15287398309530448. PMID 6668609.
- Matsumura, F (March 1995). "Mechanism of action of dioxin-type chemicals, pesticides, and other xenobiotics affecting nutritional indexes". The American Journal of Clinical Nutrition. 61 (3): 695S–701S. doi:10.1093/ajcn/61.3.695s. PMID 7879740.
- Pope, Carey N.; Liu, Jing (2020). An introduction to interdisciplinary toxicology: from molecules to man (1st ed.). London: Academic press, an imprint of Elsevier. pp. 127–138. ISBN 9780128136034.
- Tai, H.L.; Mcreynolds, J.H.; Goldstein, J.A.; Eugster, H.P.; Sengstag, C.; Alworth, W.L.; Olson, J.R. (November 1993). "Cytochrome-P4501A1 Mediates the Metabolism of 2,3,7,8-Tetrachlorodibenzofuran in the Rat and Human". Toxicology and Applied Pharmacology. 123 (1): 34–42. Bibcode:1993ToxAP.123...34T. doi:10.1006/taap.1993.1218. PMID 8236259.
