= Furobufen =

Anti-inflammatory drug

- Furobufen Molecular structure of furobufen.

Names
- IUPAC name 4-dibenzofuran-2-yl-4-oxobutanoic acid

Identifiers
CAS Number	38873-55-1
3D model (JSmol)	Interactive image
ChEBI	CHEBI:752617
ChEMBL	ChEMBL2107411
ChemSpider	34947
DrugBank	DB20775
ECHA InfoCard	100.237.136
EC Number	809-252-3
KEGG	D04277
PubChem CID	38117
UNII	HW206V7TUA
CompTox Dashboard (EPA)	DTXSID50192126
- InChI: Key: LQVMQEYROPXMQH-UHFFFAOYSA-N; InChI=1S/C16H12O4/c17-13(6-8-16(18)19)10-5-7-15-12(9-10)11-3-1-2-4-14(11)20-15/h1-5,7,9H,6,8H2,(H,18,19) Key: LQVMQEYROPXMQH-UHFFFAOYSA-N
- SMILES: C1=CC=C2C(=C1)C3=C(O2)C=CC(=C3)C(=O)CCC(=O)O

Properties
Chemical formula	C_{16}H_{12}O_{4}
Molar mass	268.26 g/mol
Appearance	Off-white to light yellow solid
Density	1.344±0.06 g/cm^{3}
Melting point	185–186 °C (365–367 °F; 458–459 K)
Solubility in DMSO	100 mg/mL

Hazards
- GHS labelling
Pictograms	(GHS07: Exclamation mark)
Hazard statements	H302
Precautionary statements	P264, P270, P301+P317, P330, P501
- Lethal dose or concentration (LD, LC)
LD_{50} (median dose)	1283 mg/kg (oral, rat)
- Except where otherwise noted, data are given for materials in their standard state (at 25 °C [77 °F], 100 kPa). Infobox references

Furobufen is an anti-inflammatory drug. It produces an analgesic effect in inflamed tissues, and also exhibits antiarthritic and antipyretic effects. It is a close structural relative of fenbufen, both of which are prepared using succinic anhydride, albeit being derivatives of different compounds (dibenzofuran and biphenyl respectively). Although it was tested on humans, it did not progress beyond Phase 2 trials to be approved for commercial usage, and is only used for laboratory and scientific research.

== Structure ==
Furobufen is composed of a dibenzofuran ring system (two benzene rings and a furan ring) with a 4-oxobutanoic acid chain attached. The ring system is flat and fully aromatic. The side-chain is attached to this system through its ketone carbon, and it ends with a carboxylic acid functional group, which causes it to be weakly acidic in solution.

== Synthesis ==
Furobufen can be synthesised from its precursors, dibenzofuran and succinic anhydride, through the Friedel-Crafts acylation reaction:

C_{12}H_{8}O + (CH_{2}CO)_{2}O → C_{16}H_{12}O_{4}

Aluminium chloride (AlCl_{3}) is used as a catalyst for the reaction, as is typical for Friedel-Crafts acylation reactions.

== Properties ==
=== Pharmacology ===
The compound is classified as a non-steroidal anti-inflammatory drug (NSAID). In humans, it is rapidly converted to 2-dibenzofuranacetic acid (DBFA), which is the main metabolite. Both compounds have a great affinity for human serum albumin.

It has anti-inflammatory, analgesic, antipyretic, and antiarthritic properties.

=== Physical properties ===
Furobufen appears as crystals whose colour may range from white to a light yellow. It has a melting point of approximately 185°C, and a boiling point of 509.8 ± 30°C. It is soluble in dimethyl sulfoxide (DMSO).

It is an achiral compound and does not exhibit any optical activity. It has no defined stereocentres. This differentiates it from other NSAIDs such as ibuprofen, which has a stereocentre.

== See also ==
- Fenbufen
- Non-steroidal anti-inflammatory drug
