= CBDO =

CBDO may refer to:

- CBDO (AM), a radio station (690 AM) licensed to Fort Simpson, Northwest Territories, Canada
- 2,2,4,4-Tetramethyl-1,3-cyclobutanediol (CBDO)
- Chief business development officer
