= Alkenylsuccinic anhydrides =

Class of chemical compounds

General structure of alkenyl succinic anhydrides (ASA) without stereochemistry; R^{1} and R^{2} are alkyl groups.

Alkenyl succinic anhydrides (ASA) are derivatives of succinic anhydrides. One H of the succinic anhydride ring is replaced with an iso-alkenyl chain (C_{14} to C_{22}). ASA's are colorless and usually viscous liquids. They are widely used, especially in surface sizing of paper, paperboard, and cardboard, as well as in the hydrophobicization of cellulose fibers. Products treated with it show reduced penetration of aqueous media, such as inks or drinks (like milk or fruit juices).

In terms of their mode of action, the anhydride is proposed to react with the hydroxyl groups on the cellulose, forming an ester. The alkenyl side-chain modifies the surface properties of the paper product. The application is similar to that for alkyl ketene dimers. In the United States alkenylsuccinic anhydrides are the preferred paper sizing agents, whereas in Europe, alkyl ketene dimers (AKDs) predominate.

== History ==
The reaction of maleic anhydride (MA) with aliphatic monounsaturated n- and iso-alkenes was described as early as 1936 in a patent. The alkenes are obtained from the "cracked distillate", a distillate fraction with a high content of unsaturation formed by cracking of petroleum.

Reaction producing ASA

The patent describes the reaction of the alkenes with excess maleic anhydride at 200 °C in an autoclave. The excess alkene is removed by distillation in vacuo, the resulting alkenyl succinic anhydride hydrolyzed with dilute sodium hydroxide solution and the disodium salt reacted with an acid to achieve an alkenebutanedioic acid. However, under the "many useful applications" described for the products obtained, the use as a size has not yet been mentioned. 30% higher reaction yields were achieved with a pre-cleaned cracked petroleum distillate in an autoclave at 210 °C and it was found that the hydrolysis of the succinic anhydride can already be carried out with steam.

In the early technical applications as lubricants and rust inhibitors, the products dark brown color and black, tar-like polymer residues was unproblematic. However, for later use in cleaners and detergents, clear (meaning polymer-free) and less dark colored alkenyl succinic anhydride (ASA) were needed.

The use of alkenylsuccinic anhydrides to hydrophobize cellulose-based (cotton) textiles (first patented in 1959) and the transfer of this concept to the hydrophobization of paper using iso-octadecenyl succinic anhydrides (C_{18}-ASA) in 1963 required liquid, particle-free colours with a colour as light as possible.

After initial difficulties in using ASA for paper sizing (particularly the rapid hydrolysis to alkenyl succinic acids and the formation of poorly soluble calcium salts in hard water and deposits in the paper machine), process parameters could be adjusted to make alkenyl succinic anhydrides the most important sizing agents in the US.

=== ASA in Russia ===
==== Market dynamics and supply chain changes ====
Over the past decade, the Russian pulp and paper industry has demonstrated steady growth in the paperboard and corrugated board production segment. By 2021, the market volume reached 4.2 million tonnes, with a monetary value of 254.9 billion rubles, 18.3% higher than in 2017.

The raw materials market underwent significant changes in March 2022, when the Finnish company Kemira, which previously controlled approximately 70% of the Russian market, ceased direct supplies of the ASA sizing agent. Amid the resulting shortage, the industry was forced to redirect to alternative suppliers from the United States, Greece, and China, which led to a sharp increase in the average procurement cost of this raw material. As a result, the share of sizing agent costs in the total production cost of pulp and paper products increased significantly — from 17.5% to 48%.

==== Development from Mari El ====
Traditional production of alkenyl succinic anhydride requires high temperatures and complex catalyst filtration. AKTO has implemented a technology at the C6 plant in Mari El that eliminates the solid-phase purification stage during synthesis. This simplifies production and improves the efficiency of the finished product, which was named AQUASIZE AS.

==== Production technology and performance characteristics ====
Laboratory and industrial trials of the Russian alkenyl succinic anhydride (ASA) "AQUASIZE AS" (manufacturer: AKTO) confirmed its equivalence to benchmark imported analogues. When sizing various grades of paper and paperboard — including sack kraft paper, top liner, and linerboards — the product demonstrates sizing degrees and water absorbency reduction rates comparable to imported references. No hydrolysis is observed during paper machine operation. According to industry experts, trial production runs recorded a decrease in hydrolysis-related emissions, attributed to the absence of residual alpha-olefins in the composition, despite a potential increase in sizing agent consumption. The reagent delivers full sizing development on-machine and maintains stability across a wide range of pH values and temperatures.

==== Production process features ====
Conventional ASA synthesis requires high temperatures and complex catalyst filtration. At the production facilities of the C6 plant in the Republic of Mari El, a technology has been implemented that eliminates the solid-phase purification stage during synthesis, thereby optimizing the technological process. Production operates on a continuous-cycle basis using raw materials from domestic chemical manufacturers, enabling order fulfillment within up to 4 days. The finished reagent does not require constant adjustment of working dosages, maintains physicochemical stability during prolonged storage, and remains effective at reduced consumption rates.

==== Emulsion preparation methods and logistics ====
Flexible technological schemes are provided for emulsion preparation: the conventional method involving heating and starch, or a "cold" method based on the AQUAFIX polymer. Both methods produce stable emulsion particles smaller than 2 μm, reducing the likelihood of defects during paper web formation and allowing mills to select a scheme based on current capacity utilization, thereby eliminating dependence on equipment constraints. The solidification point of the finished reagent does not exceed 5 °C, which simplifies its transportation in tankers and winter storage at mill warehouses without the need for specialized temperature-controlled conditions. This development is regarded as an import substitution initiative in the pulp and paper industry, aimed at securing independence from the complex logistics of imported raw materials and stabilizing production costs.

There is no longer a total dependence on imports for imparting hydrophobic properties to paper and paperboard. The AKTO team was able to advance from hypothesis to industrial application of the AQUASIZE AS product at mills in a short period. The C6 plant is precisely the kind of operation seeking such solutions: not only technology localization, but also the sourcing of local raw materials. This approach will shape both the unique product and the production process as a whole

— Artem Permyakov

== Preparation ==
ASAs are prepared in the Alder-ene reaction of alkenes with maleic anhydride at high temperatures (> 200 °C). Thereby, competing reactions occur, such as oxidation, condensation and (alternating co-) polymerization. The undesirable secondary products are formed reduce the yield of ASA and adversely affect color, texture and processability of the final products. Unbranched 1-alkenylsuccinic anhydrides, which can be obtained from 1-alkenes, are solid at room temperature and not suited for engine sizing from aqueous emulsion.

In the SHOP process, even-numbered 1-alkenes (CH_{2}=CH-(CH_{2})_{n}-CH_{3}, produced by oligomerization of ethylene) are isomerized on magnesium oxide catalysts with displacement of the double bond to a position along the carbon chain. Subsequently, the crude product is separated by distillation into the desired fractions, the fraction preferred for ASA production is the C_{14} – C_{22}.

Isomerization from terminal alkene to internal alkenes.

The alkenyl succinic anhydrides are prepared with an excess of isoalkene at temperatures >200 °C under nitrogen atmosphere for more than 3 hours; the excess iso-alkene is distilled off at reduced pressure.

Synthesis of ASA from maleic anhydride and alkene.

Extensive patent literature exists with regard to the suppression of side reactions in the production of ASA. The formation of polymer can be reduced by the addition of antioxidants or polymerization inhibitors (for example hydroquinone or phenothiazine). Thereby, a quantitative reaction of the maleic anhydride can be achieved. Later, it was also achieved to improve the color of the obtained solid ASA from dark brown to amber by washing with water. By combining a reducing agent (such as a trialkyl phosphite) with a phenolic antioxidant, a significant lightening and reduction of tar formation is achieved.

However, recent patents show that the problem of discoloration and tar formation in ASA synthesis is still insufficiently resolved. Recent patents include a sterically hindered phenol (BHT as a primary antioxidant), a thioether (as a secondary antioxidant) and N,N'-disalicylidene-1,2-diaminopropane as a metal ion deactivator in a "synergistic blend". The C12-ASA formed from dodecene and MAN after six hours at 220 °C is light yellow in color but still contains significant amounts of black, tarry decomposition products. A dramatic improvement (by 600%) in sizing efficiency is found with alkenyl succinic anhydrides based on symmetrical alkenes, such as the C22 alkene docos-11-en (by alkene metathesis from dodec-1-ene).

== Use ==
Alkenylsuccinic anhydrides - and the alkenylsuccinic acids obtainable therefrom by hydrolysis - possess reactive and surface-active properties. They find use as hardeners for epoxy resins, as corrosion inhibitors in lubricating oils, as reactants in alkyd resins and unsaturated polyester resins, as an additive in motor oil and fuels, as components in plasticizers, as additives in toner resins, as surfactants, as water-binding and moisture-controlling additives, as metal cleaners and as chemical intermediates. By far the most important use of alkenylsuccinic anhydrides by volume is the surface and bulk sizing of paper and cardboard with a global consumption of approximately 47,000 tonnes (in 2005).

=== Alkenylsuccinic anhydrides as paper sizing agents ===
Solid alkylketene dimers (AKD) were introduced in the 1950s as hydrophobizing agents for cellulose-based products. They were followed in the 1960s by liquid alkenyl succinic anhydrides. Both compound classes are hydrophobic and therefore virtually insoluble in water - the solubility of the commonly used iso-octadecenylsuccinic anhydride (C_{18}-ASA) is only 5.33×10^{−5} mgl^{−1}. ASA are less hydrophobic and thus less water repellent than AKD because of their shorter chain length. Their vapor pressure is higher than that of AKD, allowing them to diffuse faster into and through the paper layer. However, they also tend to form deposits on machine covers. AKD are at room temperature aqueous dispersions, while ASA are oil-in-water emulsions. The main difference, however, is the much higher reactivity of the cyclic carboxylic anhydride structure in the ASA compared to the diketene structure in AKD. This is accompanied by the much faster hydrolysis in aqueous, especially alkaline media. Therefore, alkenyl succinic anhydrides can be converted into an emulsion only before the use in the paper machine, while AKD can be delivered and stored as stable emulsions.

ASA emulsions are prepared like AKD dispersions with polycations as protective colloids and retention aids (especially with cationic starch or cationic polyacrylamides (C-PAM) in the ratio ASA to cation of about 2: 1) and with about 1% anionic or nonionic surfactants. An optimal particle size of about 1 μm is obtained with high shear.

The benefits of ASA when used in paper sizing include:

- Applicability in neutral to slightly alkaline pH range (optimal pH 6-8) - AKD even pH 5-9)
- High reactivity leads to hydrophobing already in the wet end of the paper process
- Hydrophobization degree easily adjustable (unlike with AKD)
- Lower dosage at ASA (0.1% based on pulp) than at AKD (0.2%)
- Little influence on paper properties - AKD can lead to sticky paper surfaces at high dosage
- Good surface sizing
- High aging resistance of the treated paper

The disadvantages of ASA are in particular:

- High hydrolysis tendency
- Very low storage stability
- Emulsion production only at the paper machine with high investment and operating costs
- Risk of formation of sticky deposits in the machine
- Oily deposits in the dryer area

Faster reaction and lower input quantities (and thus material costs in one of the most costly steps in papermaking) speak for the use of ASA, while AKD more sustainable water repellency and better adhesion in material composites with e.g. polyethylene films for water and acid-resistant beverage packaging effect. ASA are desirable, when faster reactions are needed and lower input quantities are used (leading to lower material costs in one of the most costly steps in papermaking). In contrast, AKDs result in more sustainable water repellency and better adhesion in material composites with, for example, polyethylene films for water and acid-resistant beverage packaging.

=== Paper sizing with alkenyl succinic anhydrides ===
As with AKD, paper sizing with ASA proceeds in theory in three steps:

1. the retention or fixation of the ASA emulsion droplets on the wet paper pulp
2. bursting the emulsion droplets via spreading on the surface and penetration into the pulp
3. the formation of a hydrophobic paper surface with contact angles >100° by covalent linkage of the ASA molecules with the hydroxyl groups of the cellulose

Possible esterification reaction between ASA with cellulose.

It has been demonstrated that no or very little ASA is bound to cellulose via covalent ester bonds. These findings suggests that the ASA-induced hydrophobing is rather based on an adsorptive and associative interaction of the alkenylsuccinic acids (formed by rapid hydrolysis in the aqueous medium) with the constituents of the paper pulp (cellulosic fibers and fillers, such as precipitated calcium carbonate or cationic polymers). Even small amounts and also inhomogeneous distribution are suffice for a high degree of hydrophobicity.

Enormous challenges are posed by the trend towards recycled materials paper as raw material (the so-called secondary fibers), the rapid increase in the volume of cardboard at the expense of printing paper, the growing speeds (> 120 km/h) and production quantities (maximum daily capacity of a single machine >4,500 tons or >1.5 million tons per year), the further development of ASA-based sizing agents for cellulose and its formulations. This is especially true given the still very empirical understanding of the basic processes of hydrophobing cellulose fibers.

== Polyisobutenylsuccinic anhydride ==
ASAs are related to the class of polyisobutylenylsuccinic anhydrides, known as PIBSAs. In these compounds, the alkene used is polyisobutylene. Such compounds are commonly used as reactive intermediates in the petroleum additive industry. They are reacted with ethyleneamines to give the corresponding succinimides useful as dispersants in lubricants and fuels. and deposit-control agents

There are two types of polyisobutene used for this purpose, and they are commonly known as conventional and HR (highly reactive) PIB. Conventional PIB is made by polymerizing Raffinate 1 that contains a mixture of C_{4} butenes with aluminum trichloride as catalyst. In comparison, HR PIB is made by polymerizing isobutene using boron trifluoride as catalyst. The methyl vinylidene content of PIB controls its reactivity toward maleic anhydride. HR PIB has 85% methyl vinylidene, making it more reactive than conventional PIB that only has 10%. Being more reactive, HR PIB requires less forcing conditions for its reaction with maleic anhydride. The PIBSA produced contains less tars and side products as a result.

== Literature ==
- Hubbe, M.A. (2004), Edwards, G. (ed.), Acidic and Alkaline Sizings for Printing, Writing, and Drawing Papers, Charlottesville, VA, USA: The Book and Paper Group Annual 23, pp. 139–151
- Bajpai, P. (2015), Pulp and Paper Chemicals (1st ed.), Amsterdam: Elsevier, ISBN 978-0-12-803408-8
- Arnson, T.; et al. (2005), J.M. Gess; J.M. Rodriguez (eds.), The Sizing of Paper (3rd ed.), Atlanta, GA, USA: TAPPI Press, ISBN 978-1-59510-073-3
- Hubbe, M.A. (2006), "Paper's Resistance to Water – A Review of Internal Sizing Chemicals and their Effects", BioResources, vol. 2, no. 1, pp. 106–145
- Hagiopol, C.; Johnston, J.W. (2011), Chemistry of Modern Papermaking, Boca Raton, FL, GA, USA: CRC Press, ISBN 978-1-4398-5646-8
