= C19H25ClN2O2 =

The molecular formula C_{19}H_{25}ClN_{2}O_{2} (molar mass: 348.87 g/mol, exact mass: 348.1605 u) may refer to:

- NNC 38-1049
- Zatosetron (LY-277,359)
