= 2,2,4,4-Tetramethylcyclobutanedione =

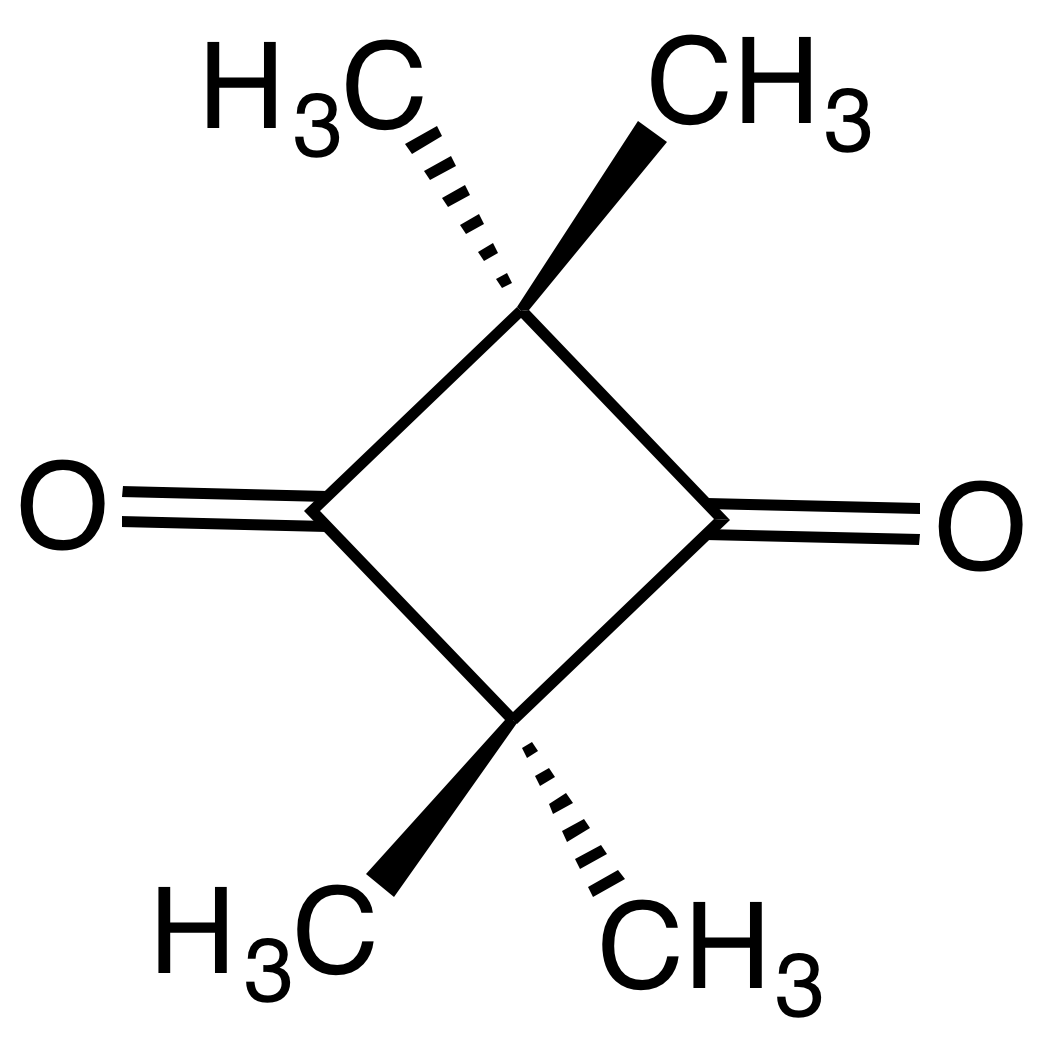

Names
- Preferred IUPAC name 2,2,4,4-Tetramethylcyclobutane-1,3-dione
- Other names Tetramethyl-1,3-cyclobutanedione, Tetramethylcyclobuta-1,3-dione

Identifiers
CAS Number	933-52-8
3D model (JSmol)	Interactive image
ChEMBL	ChEMBL3183999
ChemSpider	13028
ECHA InfoCard	100.012.063
EC Number	213-269-6
PubChem CID	13617
UNII	RT4AQ22KS4
CompTox Dashboard (EPA)	DTXSID4044745
- InChI: InChI=1S/C8H12O2/c1-7(2)5(9)8(3,4)6(7)10/h1-4H3 Key: RGCDVHNITQEYPO-UHFFFAOYSA-N
- SMILES: CC1(C(=O)C(C1=O)(C)C)C

Properties
Chemical formula	C_{8}H_{12}O_{2}
Molar mass	140.182 g·mol^{−1}
Appearance	Colorless or white solid
Melting point	112–115 °C (234–239 °F; 385–388 K)
- Except where otherwise noted, data are given for materials in their standard state (at 25 °C [77 °F], 100 kPa). Infobox references

2,2,4,4-Tetramethylcyclobutanedione is the organic compound with the formula (CH_{3})_{4}C_{4}O_{2}. The compound is a diketone of cyclobutane, bearing four methyl groups. It is a white solid that is used as a precursor to diverse industrial products.

== Synthesis and reactions ==
2,2,4,4-Tetramethylcyclobutanedione is the head-to-tail dimer of dimethylketene. It arises spontaneously when dimethylketene is produced by dehydrohalogenation of isobutyryl chloride with triethylamine.

In the presence of aluminium trichloride, 2,2,4,4-tetramethylcyclobutanedione isomerizes to the lactone dimethylketene dimer (4-isopropylidene-3,3-dimethyl-2-oxetanone). Dimethylketene dimer is a precursor to various alkyl ketene dimers, which are used in papermaking.

Isomerisierung von Tetramethyl-1,3-cyclobutandion zum Dimethylketendimer Isomerisation of tetramethyl-1,3-cyclobutanedione to Dimethyl ketene dimer

Hydrogenation of 2,2,4,4-tetramethylcyclobutanedione gives 2,2,4,4-tetramethylcyclobutanediol, which is of interest in polymer chemistry.
