= Succinic anhydride =

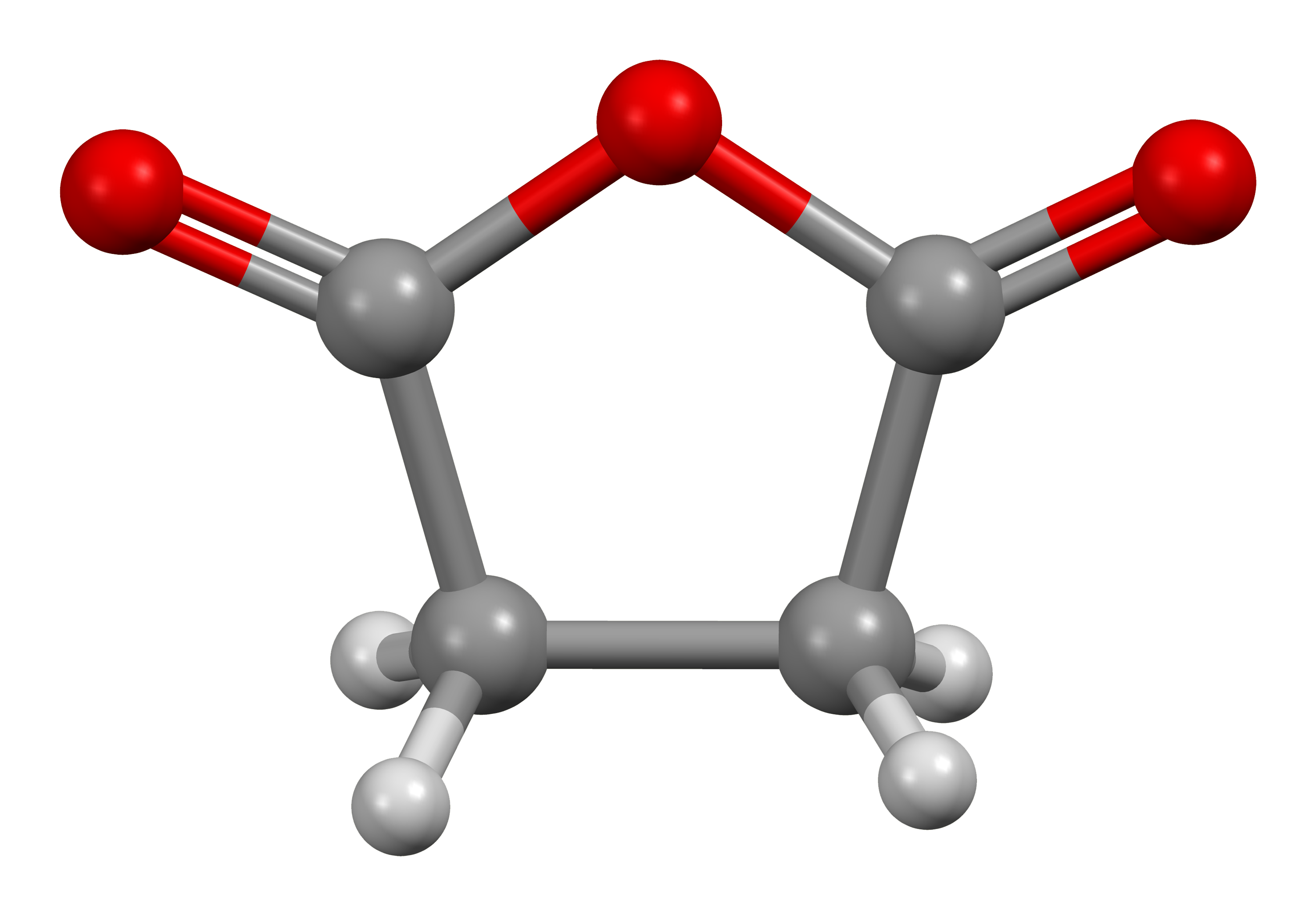

Names
- Preferred IUPAC name Oxolane-2,5-dione
- Other names 3,4-Dihydrofuran-2,5-dione, Butanedioic anhydride Dihydrofuran-2,5-dione; Succinic acid anhydride Succinyl oxide Dihydro-2,5-furandione

Identifiers
CAS Number	108-30-5
3D model (JSmol)	Interactive image
ChEBI	CHEBI:36595
ChemSpider	7634
ECHA InfoCard	100.003.246
KEGG	C19524
PubChem CID	7922
UNII	6RF4O17Z8J
CompTox Dashboard (EPA)	DTXSID7021287
- InChI: InChI=1S/C4H4O3/c5-3-1-2-4(6)7-3/h1-2H2 Key: RINCXYDBBGOEEQ-UHFFFAOYSA-N; InChI=1/C4H4O3/c5-3-1-2-4(6)7-3/h1-2H2 Key: RINCXYDBBGOEEQ-UHFFFAOYAN
- SMILES: O=C1OC(=O)CC1

Properties
Chemical formula	C_{4}H_{4}O_{3}
Molar mass	100.073 g·mol^{−1}
Appearance	Colorless crystalline needles
Density	1.23 g/cm^{3}
Melting point	119 to 120 °C (246 to 248 °F; 392 to 393 K)
Boiling point	261 °C (502 °F; 534 K)
Solubility in water	Decomposes
Magnetic susceptibility (χ)	−47.5·10^{−6} cm^{3}/mol

Hazards
Flash point	147 °C (297 °F; 420 K)
- Lethal dose or concentration (LD, LC)
LD_{50} (median dose)	1510 mg/kg (oral, rat)
- Except where otherwise noted, data are given for materials in their standard state (at 25 °C [77 °F], 100 kPa). verify (what is ?) Infobox references

Succinic anhydride, is an organic compound with the molecular formula (CH_{2}CO)_{2}O. This colorless solid is the acid anhydride of succinic acid.

== Preparation ==
In the laboratory, this material can be prepared by dehydration of succinic acid. Such dehydration can occur with the help of acetyl chloride or phosphoryl chloride, or thermally.

Industrially, succinic anhydride is prepared by catalytic hydrogenation of maleic anhydride.

== Reactions ==
Succinic anhydride hydrolyzes readily to give succinic acid:

(CH_{2}CO)_{2}O + H_{2}O → (CH_{2}CO_{2}H)_{2}

With alcohols (ROH), a similar reaction occurs, delivering the monoester:

(CH_{2}CO)_{2}O + ROH → RO_{2}CCH_{2}CH_{2}CO_{2}H

Succinic anhydride is used in acylations under Friedel-Crafts conditions, as illustrated by the industrial route to the drug Fenbufen.

== Related compounds ==
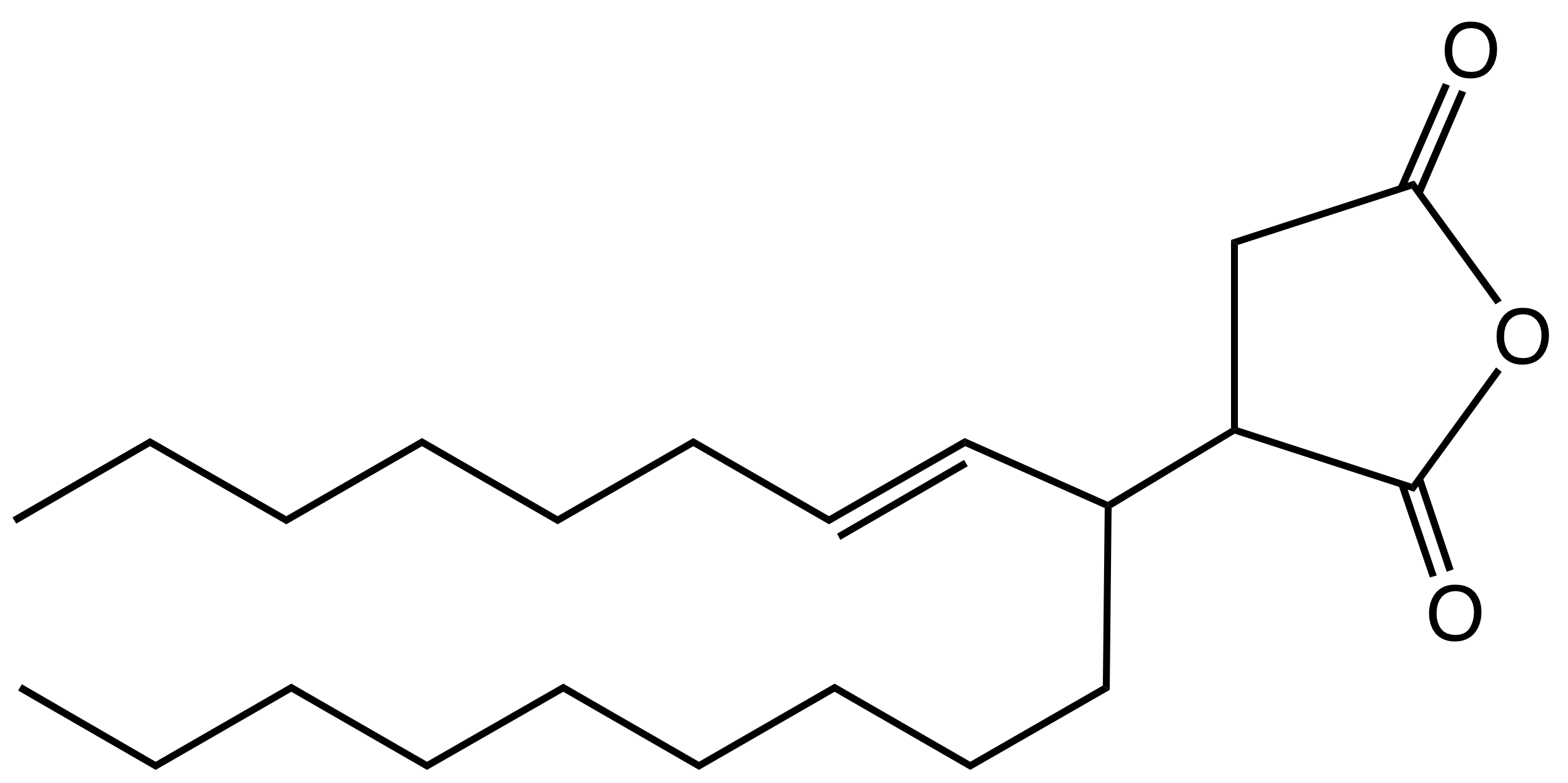
Chemical structure of an alkylsuccinic anhydride derived from octadecene

Maleic anhydride undergoes the Alder-ene reaction with alkenes to give alkenylsuccinic anhydrides. Such compounds are sizing agents in the paper industry. In this role, the anhydride is proposed to form an ester with the hydroxyl groups on the cellulose fibers. Maleic anhydride undergoes a similar reaction with polyisobutylene to give polyisobutylenylsuccinic anhydride, a common building block chemical in the petroleum additives industry.

== Drugs List ==
Succinic anhydride is used in the synthesis of the following list of agents:

1. Haloperidol
2. Oxaprozin
3. Procodazole
4. Endixaprine
5. Clofilium phosphate
6. Indolidan
7. Lometraline
8. McN 4612-z
9. Fenbufen
10. Furobufen
11. NNC 38-1049
12. Piretanide
13. Pirisudanol
14. Cinazepam
15. Bucloxic acid
16. Exatecan
17. Blarcamesine
18. Ibutilide
19. Diclomezine
20. Domipizone
21. Daminozide
22. Trepibutone
23. Benfurodil hemisuccinate
24. Tepoxalin
25. Menbutone
26. Florantyrone
27. Artesunate
28. Suxibuzone
29. Sunepitron
30. Prizidilol
31. Xemilofiban
32. Sulfasuccinamide
33. Succisulfone

== See also ==
- Maleic anhydride
