= Polychlorinated dibenzofurans =

Family of organic compounds

General chemical structure of PCDFs, where 1 ≤ n+m ≤ 8

Structures of the ten 2,3,7,8-substituted PCDF congeners that are toxicologically of most relevance

Polychlorinated dibenzofurans (PCDFs) are a family of organic compounds with one or several of the hydrogens in the dibenzofuran structure replaced by chlorines. For example, 2,3,7,8-tetrachlorodibenzofuran (TCDF) has chlorine atoms substituted for each of the hydrogens on the number 2, 3, 7, and 8 carbons (see structure in the upper left corner of the second image). Polychlorinated dibenzofurans with chlorines at least in positions 2,3,7 and 8 are much more toxic than the parent compound dibenzofuran, with properties and chemical structures similar to polychlorinated dibenzodioxins. These groups together are often inaccurately called dioxins. They are known developmental toxicants, and suspected human carcinogens. PCDFs tend to co-occur with polychlorinated dibenzodioxins (PCDDs). PCDFs can be formed by pyrolysis or incineration at temperatures below 1200 °C of chlorine containing products, such as PVC, PCBs, and other organochlorides, or of non-chlorine containing products in the presence of chlorine donors. Dibenzofurans are known persistent organic pollutants (POP), classified among the dirty dozen in the Stockholm Convention on Persistent Organic Pollutants.

== Congeners ==
Table of PCDF congeners
Number	Formula	Name	CAS Number	InChIKey
PCDF-1	C_{12}H_{7}ClO	1-chlorodibenzofuran	84761-86-4	WRSMJZYBNIAAEE-UHFFFAOYSA-N
PCDF-2	C_{12}H_{7}ClO	2-chlorodibenzofuran	51230-49-0	PRKTYWJFCODJOA-UHFFFAOYSA-N
PCDF-3	C_{12}H_{7}ClO	3-chlorodibenzofuran	25074-67-3	BBOZMMAURMEVAR-UHFFFAOYSA-N
PCDF-4	C_{12}H_{7}ClO	4-chlorodibenzofuran	74992-96-4	RHRYBWFAHXCUCR-UHFFFAOYSA-N
PCDF-12	C_{12}H_{6}Cl_{2}O	1,2-dichlorodibenzofuran	64126-85-8	QVAPRJWSOUITIF-UHFFFAOYSA-N
PCDF-13	C_{12}H_{6}Cl_{2}O	1,3-dichlorodibenzofuran	94538-00-8	VKIBKEFGJSPRJC-UHFFFAOYSA-N
PCDF-14	C_{12}H_{6}Cl_{2}O	1,4-dichlorodibenzofuran	94538-01-9	VHQCMZLPHWGUDB-UHFFFAOYSA-N
PCDF-16	C_{12}H_{6}Cl_{2}O	1,6-dichlorodibenzofuran	74992-97-5	JRSRWACZUFLWKF-UHFFFAOYSA-N
PCDF-17	C_{12}H_{6}Cl_{2}O	1,7-dichlorodibenzofuran	94538-02-0	XRQNHPGZRFKBJW-UHFFFAOYSA-N
PCDF-18	C_{12}H_{6}Cl_{2}O	1,8-dichlorodibenzofuran	81638-37-1	UAFNQQBPUWFPGC-UHFFFAOYSA-N
PCDF-19	C_{12}H_{6}Cl_{2}O	1,9-dichlorodibenzofuran	70648-14-5	AEKSGHBVWJHELW-UHFFFAOYSA-N
PCDF-23	C_{12}H_{6}Cl_{2}O	2,3-dichlorodibenzofuran	64126-86-9	GETJJZZRPQFSFM-UHFFFAOYSA-N
PCDF-24	C_{12}H_{6}Cl_{2}O	2,4-dichlorodibenzofuran	24478-74-8	LHTCKMYRNOGUOA-UHFFFAOYSA-N
PCDF-26	C_{12}H_{6}Cl_{2}O	2,6-dichlorodibenzofuran	60390-27-4	XVLCNKFGFHUQNL-UHFFFAOYSA-N
PCDF-27	C_{12}H_{6}Cl_{2}O	2,7-dichlorodibenzofuran	74992-98-6	DOZUTNBCPVUMPY-UHFFFAOYSA-N
PCDF-28	C_{12}H_{6}Cl_{2}O	2,8-dichlorodibenzofuran	5409-83-6	IVVRJIDVYSPKFZ-UHFFFAOYSA-N
PCDF-34	C_{12}H_{6}Cl_{2}O	3,4-dichlorodibenzofuran	94570-83-9	HYQGGNWDPQZLGX-UHFFFAOYSA-N
PCDF-36	C_{12}H_{6}Cl_{2}O	3,6-dichlorodibenzofuran	74918-40-4	DMOBGFAKTSXOHG-UHFFFAOYSA-N
PCDF-37	C_{12}H_{6}Cl_{2}O	3,7-dichlorodibenzofuran	58802-21-4	OLTYAGNRSNFHLK-UHFFFAOYSA-N
PCDF-46	C_{12}H_{6}Cl_{2}O	4,6-dichlorodibenzofuran	64560-13-0	BZFIZJNKNCJEAD-UHFFFAOYSA-N
PCDF-123	C_{12}H_{5}Cl_{3}O	1,2,3-trichlorodibenzofuran	83636-47-9	LADSWAAWPMGHBE-UHFFFAOYSA-N
PCDF-124	C_{12}H_{5}Cl_{3}O	1,2,4-trichlorodibenzofuran	24478-73-7	RQIWKWHVZLDXEJ-UHFFFAOYSA-N
PCDF-126	C_{12}H_{5}Cl_{3}O	1,2,6-trichlorodibenzofuran	64560-15-2	CYRZCBUWRUACKJ-UHFFFAOYSA-N
PCDF-127	C_{12}H_{5}Cl_{3}O	1,2,7-trichlorodibenzofuran	83704-37-4	AFOVQGPNOZDUEP-UHFFFAOYSA-N
PCDF-128	C_{12}H_{5}Cl_{3}O	1,2,8-trichlorodibenzofuran	83704-34-1	UYIGPSPCOXGBCS-UHFFFAOYSA-N
PCDF-129	C_{12}H_{5}Cl_{3}O	1,2,9-trichlorodibenzofuran	83704-38-5	ICTXINQOXPMQPM-UHFFFAOYSA-N
PCDF-134	C_{12}H_{5}Cl_{3}O	1,3,4-trichlorodibenzofuran	82911-61-3	FIPOITUDJFQRRN-UHFFFAOYSA-N
PCDF-136	C_{12}H_{5}Cl_{3}O	1,3,6-trichlorodibenzofuran	83704-39-6	AGPTXRLVBIRYLV-UHFFFAOYSA-N
PCDF-137	C_{12}H_{5}Cl_{3}O	1,3,7-trichlorodibenzofuran	64560-16-3	INRBXOGZPDFCLQ-UHFFFAOYSA-N
PCDF-138	C_{12}H_{5}Cl_{3}O	1,3,8-trichlorodibenzofuran	76621-12-0	PHFSTDOPTZHECA-UHFFFAOYSA-N
PCDF-139	C_{12}H_{5}Cl_{3}O	1,3,9-trichlorodibenzofuran	83704-40-9	SPPGDLROKBFNNO-UHFFFAOYSA-N
PCDF-146	C_{12}H_{5}Cl_{3}O	1,4,6-trichlorodibenzofuran	82911-60-2	XDQRWSUJOURTHK-UHFFFAOYSA-N
PCDF-147	C_{12}H_{5}Cl_{3}O	1,4,7-trichlorodibenzofuran	83704-41-0	XTLMVJUSIANHND-UHFFFAOYSA-N
PCDF-148	C_{12}H_{5}Cl_{3}O	1,4,8-trichlorodibenzofuran	64560-14-1	PCQCYDNFBUADOK-UHFFFAOYSA-N
PCDF-149	C_{12}H_{5}Cl_{3}O	1,4,9-trichlorodibenzofuran	70648-13-4	NVYUPBVXKLTYHV-UHFFFAOYSA-N
PCDF-167 (PCDF-349)	C_{12}H_{5}Cl_{3}O	1,6,7-trichlorodibenzofuran	83704-46-5	HEWLCNCSWBMZHG-UHFFFAOYSA-N
PCDF-168 (PCDF-249)	C_{12}H_{5}Cl_{3}O	1,6,8-trichlorodibenzofuran	82911-59-9	ZOBVYDQWZXUJNO-UHFFFAOYSA-N
PCDF-178 (PCDF-239)	C_{12}H_{5}Cl_{3}O	1,7,8-trichlorodibenzofuran	58802-18-9	YNMCXGLWHTVMQO-UHFFFAOYSA-N
PCDF-234	C_{12}H_{5}Cl_{3}O	2,3,4-trichlorodibenzofuran	57117-34-7	YDLADWPBKZODCJ-UHFFFAOYSA-N
PCDF-236	C_{12}H_{5}Cl_{3}O	2,3,6-trichlorodibenzofuran	57117-33-6	CPMGJTLNRBIKQM-UHFFFAOYSA-N
PCDF-237	C_{12}H_{5}Cl_{3}O	2,3,7-trichlorodibenzofuran	58802-17-8	CKXMNTLGGAOERF-UHFFFAOYSA-N
PCDF-238	C_{12}H_{5}Cl_{3}O	2,3,8-trichlorodibenzofuran	57117-32-5	NUNSNNOYACKRIK-UHFFFAOYSA-N
PCDF-246	C_{12}H_{5}Cl_{3}O	2,4,6-trichlorodibenzofuran	58802-14-5	GTKURBTWZFQHHY-UHFFFAOYSA-N
PCDF-247	C_{12}H_{5}Cl_{3}O	2,4,7-trichlorodibenzofuran	83704-42-1	SZBZRVJHPZIGAY-UHFFFAOYSA-N
PCDF-248	C_{12}H_{5}Cl_{3}O	2,4,8-trichlorodibenzofuran	54589-71-8	WJURXKWTCOMRCE-UHFFFAOYSA-N
PCDF-346	C_{12}H_{5}Cl_{3}O	3,4,6-trichlorodibenzofuran	83704-43-2	XEUHBCMRIXEBTD-UHFFFAOYSA-N
PCDF-347	C_{12}H_{5}Cl_{3}O	3,4,7-trichlorodibenzofuran	83704-44-3	RPJJBTSXPNFUTA-UHFFFAOYSA-N
PCDF-348	C_{12}H_{5}Cl_{3}O	3,4,8-trichlorodibenzofuran	83704-45-4	YTZWNIQGGIJHJX-UHFFFAOYSA-N
PCDF-1234	C_{12}H_{4}Cl_{4}O	1,2,3,4-tetrachlorodibenzofuran	24478-72-6	AETAPIFVELRIDN-UHFFFAOYSA-N
PCDF-1236	C_{12}H_{4}Cl_{4}O	1,2,3,6-tetrachlorodibenzofuran	83704-21-6	BBAXFLIBRPXRBP-UHFFFAOYSA-N
PCDF-1237	C_{12}H_{4}Cl_{4}O	1,2,3,7-tetrachlorodibenzofuran	83704-22-7	MDNZFYGATDCKRB-UHFFFAOYSA-N
PCDF-1238	C_{12}H_{4}Cl_{4}O	1,2,3,8-tetrachlorodibenzofuran	62615-08-1	KFQRHGKKSHJMCO-UHFFFAOYSA-N
PCDF-1239	C_{12}H_{4}Cl_{4}O	1,2,3,9-tetrachlorodibenzofuran	83704-23-8	GNQHLJHTOATTOJ-UHFFFAOYSA-N
PCDF-1246	C_{12}H_{4}Cl_{4}O	1,2,4,6-tetrachlorodibenzofuran	71998-73-7	NLVWEKPJFUPVMZ-UHFFFAOYSA-N
PCDF-1247	C_{12}H_{4}Cl_{4}O	1,2,4,7-tetrachlorodibenzofuran	83719-40-8	MFURKMJLDQBHRA-UHFFFAOYSA-N
PCDF-1248	C_{12}H_{4}Cl_{4}O	1,2,4,8-tetrachlorodibenzofuran	64126-87-0	BFTASCFRRBHFFK-UHFFFAOYSA-N
PCDF-1249	C_{12}H_{4}Cl_{4}O	1,2,4,9-tetrachlorodibenzofuran	83704-24-9	ZUYYTCCHKQGGOV-UHFFFAOYSA-N
PCDF-1267	C_{12}H_{4}Cl_{4}O	1,2,6,7-tetrachlorodibenzofuran	83704-25-0	AUEWYHHKDYUYMI-UHFFFAOYSA-N
PCDF-1268	C_{12}H_{4}Cl_{4}O	1,2,6,8-tetrachlorodibenzofuran	83710-07-0	KCVGVSIBBGIJNZ-UHFFFAOYSA-N
PCDF-1269	C_{12}H_{4}Cl_{4}O	1,2,6,9-tetrachlorodibenzofuran	70648-18-9	IEPGLLVEBKXASE-UHFFFAOYSA-N
PCDF-1278	C_{12}H_{4}Cl_{4}O	1,2,7,8-tetrachlorodibenzofuran	58802-20-3	JODWPAQNABOHDG-UHFFFAOYSA-N
PCDF-1279	C_{12}H_{4}Cl_{4}O	1,2,7,9-tetrachlorodibenzofuran	83704-26-1	PDMFRPIFZAKMLH-UHFFFAOYSA-N
PCDF-1289	C_{12}H_{4}Cl_{4}O	1,2,8,9-tetrachlorodibenzofuran	70648-22-5	OHYCQUKMNPHFPT-UHFFFAOYSA-N
PCDF-1346	C_{12}H_{4}Cl_{4}O	1,3,4,6-tetrachlorodibenzofuran	83704-27-2	CBBDONKZEJKFJP-UHFFFAOYSA-N
PCDF-1347	C_{12}H_{4}Cl_{4}O	1,3,4,7-tetrachlorodibenzofuran	70648-16-7	UMKCVDZTSZNWRH-UHFFFAOYSA-N
PCDF-1348	C_{12}H_{4}Cl_{4}O	1,3,4,8-tetrachlorodibenzofuran	92341-04-3	XWKRJSMNDOXIHS-UHFFFAOYSA-N
PCDF-1349	C_{12}H_{4}Cl_{4}O	1,3,4,9-tetrachlorodibenzofuran	83704-28-3	PNCYJHOTZSKZPA-UHFFFAOYSA-N
PCDF-1367	C_{12}H_{4}Cl_{4}O	1,3,6,7-tetrachlorodibenzofuran	57117-36-9	PITDPGCTIMCYEZ-UHFFFAOYSA-N
PCDF-1368	C_{12}H_{4}Cl_{4}O	1,3,6,8-tetrachlorodibenzofuran	71998-72-6	BDXKVABZWRZKOS-UHFFFAOYSA-N
PCDF-1369	C_{12}H_{4}Cl_{4}O	1,3,6,9-tetrachlorodibenzofuran	83690-98-6	NJQQZRLWVLWNGD-UHFFFAOYSA-N
PCDF-1378	C_{12}H_{4}Cl_{4}O	1,3,7,8-tetrachlorodibenzofuran	57117-35-8	CSXDVUGDFSYXTD-UHFFFAOYSA-N
PCDF-1379	C_{12}H_{4}Cl_{4}O	1,3,7,9-tetrachlorodibenzofuran	64560-17-4	IEMJMCVYAORWJV-UHFFFAOYSA-N
PCDF-1467	C_{12}H_{4}Cl_{4}O	1,4,6,7-tetrachlorodibenzofuran	66794-59-0	RBFNYMHNIOKXLA-UHFFFAOYSA-N
PCDF-1468	C_{12}H_{4}Cl_{4}O	1,4,6,8-tetrachlorodibenzofuran	82911-58-8	VHOBVPNETFRJED-UHFFFAOYSA-N
PCDF-1469	C_{12}H_{4}Cl_{4}O	1,4,6,9-tetrachlorodibenzofuran	70648-19-0	JAYSBJFHDJOMGZ-UHFFFAOYSA-N
PCDF-1478	C_{12}H_{4}Cl_{4}O	1,4,7,8-tetrachlorodibenzofuran	83704-29-4	IVRDRRWQABCXLY-UHFFFAOYSA-N
PCDF-1678	C_{12}H_{4}Cl_{4}O	1,6,7,8-tetrachlorodibenzofuran	83704-33-0	KOJMOXYETDLOPN-UHFFFAOYSA-N
PCDF-2346	C_{12}H_{4}Cl_{4}O	2,3,4,6-tetrachlorodibenzofuran	83704-30-7	JNVHSHPAAMRSKK-UHFFFAOYSA-N
PCDF-2347	C_{12}H_{4}Cl_{4}O	2,3,4,7-tetrachlorodibenzofuran	83704-31-8	BROFYOSLFHTGCQ-UHFFFAOYSA-N
PCDF-2348	C_{12}H_{4}Cl_{4}O	2,3,4,8-tetrachlorodibenzofuran	83704-32-9	IIKXRERKNIJJQY-UHFFFAOYSA-N
PCDF-2367	C_{12}H_{4}Cl_{4}O	2,3,6,7-tetrachlorodibenzofuran	57117-39-2	MJCNKMDTLRSHNK-UHFFFAOYSA-N
PCDF-2368	C_{12}H_{4}Cl_{4}O	2,3,6,8-tetrachlorodibenzofuran	57117-37-0	SPMZHWVRMWWTSY-UHFFFAOYSA-N
PCDF-2378	C_{12}H_{4}Cl_{4}O	2,3,7,8-tetrachlorodibenzofuran	51207-31-9	KSMVNVHUTQZITP-UHFFFAOYSA-N
PCDF-2467	C_{12}H_{4}Cl_{4}O	2,4,6,7-tetrachlorodibenzofuran	57117-38-1	NSDXKMRVQOSASS-UHFFFAOYSA-N
PCDF-2468	C_{12}H_{4}Cl_{4}O	2,4,6,8-tetrachlorodibenzofuran	58802-19-0	ZSPJEACWUWSAGS-UHFFFAOYSA-N
PCDF-3467	C_{12}H_{4}Cl_{4}O	3,4,6,7-tetrachlorodibenzofuran	57117-40-5	LMJLCLBSUNZLNW-UHFFFAOYSA-N
PCDF-12346	C_{12}H_{3}Cl_{5}O	1,2,3,4,6-pentachlorodibenzofuran	83704-47-6	LIQJBAPSLUZUTB-UHFFFAOYSA-N
PCDF-12347	C_{12}H_{3}Cl_{5}O	1,2,3,4,7-pentachlorodibenzofuran	83704-48-7	DOJZTBGOWIYFAC-UHFFFAOYSA-N
PCDF-12348	C_{12}H_{3}Cl_{5}O	1,2,3,4,8-pentachlorodibenzofuran	67517-48-0	ZCTNDJSCLPJCRA-UHFFFAOYSA-N
PCDF-12349	C_{12}H_{3}Cl_{5}O	1,2,3,4,9-pentachlorodibenzofuran	83704-49-8	IQSZNZVZXOFRJS-UHFFFAOYSA-N
PCDF-12367	C_{12}H_{3}Cl_{5}O	1,2,3,6,7-pentachlorodibenzofuran	57117-42-7	NZUPQBVDIWCPBX-UHFFFAOYSA-N
PCDF-12368	C_{12}H_{3}Cl_{5}O	1,2,3,6,8-pentachlorodibenzofuran	83704-51-2	VHQJZOFUPXEZQZ-UHFFFAOYSA-N
PCDF-12369	C_{12}H_{3}Cl_{5}O	1,2,3,6,9-pentachlorodibenzofuran	83704-52-3	IPSFQAKXDJVQOX-UHFFFAOYSA-N
PCDF-12378	C_{12}H_{3}Cl_{5}O	1,2,3,7,8-pentachlorodibenzofuran	57117-41-6	SBMIVUVRFPGOEB-UHFFFAOYSA-N
PCDF-12379	C_{12}H_{3}Cl_{5}O	1,2,3,7,9-pentachlorodibenzofuran	83704-53-4	JVUSEQPOWCBYNG-UHFFFAOYSA-N
PCDF-12389	C_{12}H_{3}Cl_{5}O	1,2,3,8,9-pentachlorodibenzofuran	83704-54-5	NKGLWUJPCTUDEH-UHFFFAOYSA-N
PCDF-12467	C_{12}H_{3}Cl_{5}O	1,2,4,6,7-pentachlorodibenzofuran	83704-50-1	BQTCODOVGXJHRB-UHFFFAOYSA-N
PCDF-12468	C_{12}H_{3}Cl_{5}O	1,2,4,6,8-pentachlorodibenzofuran	69698-57-3	JDTUAYPJSSXDNO-UHFFFAOYSA-N
PCDF-12469	C_{12}H_{3}Cl_{5}O	1,2,4,6,9-pentachlorodibenzofuran	70648-24-7	QDQFGVXGPSYEJU-UHFFFAOYSA-N
PCDF-12478	C_{12}H_{3}Cl_{5}O	1,2,4,7,8-pentachlorodibenzofuran	58802-15-6	GCFDWHIKRXCUPJ-UHFFFAOYSA-N
PCDF-12479	C_{12}H_{3}Cl_{5}O	1,2,4,7,9-pentachlorodibenzofuran	71998-74-8	IYGVHNHWORPMFU-UHFFFAOYSA-N
PCDF-12489	C_{12}H_{3}Cl_{5}O	1,2,4,8,9-pentachlorodibenzofuran	70648-23-6	ZSPAPWGNAGTCCA-UHFFFAOYSA-N
PCDF-12678 (PCDF-23489)	C_{12}H_{3}Cl_{5}O	1,2,6,7,8-pentachlorodibenzofuran	69433-00-7	ZAAVDGLJEOXCMV-UHFFFAOYSA-N
PCDF-12679	C_{12}H_{3}Cl_{5}O	1,2,6,7,9-pentachlorodibenzofuran	70872-82-1	QQRRQEVOSMEVQB-UHFFFAOYSA-N
PCDF-13467	C_{12}H_{3}Cl_{5}O	1,3,4,6,7-pentachlorodibenzofuran	83704-36-3	JVYYDUWJIJMOGW-UHFFFAOYSA-N
PCDF-13468	C_{12}H_{3}Cl_{5}O	1,3,4,6,8-pentachlorodibenzofuran	83704-55-6	COKIAYPRHYHYCH-UHFFFAOYSA-N
PCDF-13469	C_{12}H_{3}Cl_{5}O	1,3,4,6,9-pentachlorodibenzofuran	70648-15-6	MYSAFUYQSBEEDR-UHFFFAOYSA-N
PCDF-13478	C_{12}H_{3}Cl_{5}O	1,3,4,7,8-pentachlorodibenzofuran	58802-16-7	ORSUQGVCWLXKLZ-UHFFFAOYSA-N
PCDF-13479	C_{12}H_{3}Cl_{5}O	1,3,4,7,9-pentachlorodibenzofuran	70648-20-3	GFXPLABVZOBCCW-UHFFFAOYSA-N
PCDF-13678	C_{12}H_{3}Cl_{5}O	1,3,6,7,8-pentachlorodibenzofuran	70648-21-4	FRLMQDUYUJIHCZ-UHFFFAOYSA-N
PCDF-14678	C_{12}H_{3}Cl_{5}O	1,4,6,7,8-pentachlorodibenzofuran	83704-35-2	VANGHZRYKXDPRR-UHFFFAOYSA-N
PCDF-23467	C_{12}H_{3}Cl_{5}O	2,3,4,6,7-pentachlorodibenzofuran	57117-43-8	SJFBZRQKGOGHEV-UHFFFAOYSA-N
PCDF-23468	C_{12}H_{3}Cl_{5}O	2,3,4,6,8-pentachlorodibenzofuran	67481-22-5	MKRFORPSRBMAIP-UHFFFAOYSA-N
PCDF-23478	C_{12}H_{3}Cl_{5}O	2,3,4,7,8-pentachlorodibenzofuran	57117-31-4	OGBQILNBLMPPDP-UHFFFAOYSA-N
PCDF-123467	C_{12}H_{2}Cl_{6}O	1,2,3,4,6,7-hexachlorodibenzofuran	79060-60-9	SNWFMKXFMVHBKD-UHFFFAOYSA-N
PCDF-123468	C_{12}H_{2}Cl_{6}O	1,2,3,4,6,8-hexachlorodibenzofuran	69698-60-8	UCFGNWHERVQWMZ-UHFFFAOYSA-N
PCDF-123469	C_{12}H_{2}Cl_{6}O	1,2,3,4,6,9-hexachlorodibenzofuran	91538-83-9	KFFUZIROJGXTQH-UHFFFAOYSA-N
PCDF-123478	C_{12}H_{2}Cl_{6}O	1,2,3,4,7,8-hexachlorodibenzofuran	70648-26-9	LVYBAQIVPKCOEE-UHFFFAOYSA-N
PCDF-123479	C_{12}H_{2}Cl_{6}O	1,2,3,4,7,9-hexachlorodibenzofuran	91538-84-0	BKIXWRBZCQEZAQ-UHFFFAOYSA-N
PCDF-123489	C_{12}H_{2}Cl_{6}O	1,2,3,4,8,9-hexachlorodibenzofuran	92341-07-6	VSDUQUBUJRNREH-UHFFFAOYSA-N
PCDF-123678	C_{12}H_{2}Cl_{6}O	1,2,3,6,7,8-hexachlorodibenzofuran	57117-44-9	JEYJJJXOFWNEHN-UHFFFAOYSA-N
PCDF-123679	C_{12}H_{2}Cl_{6}O	1,2,3,6,7,9-hexachlorodibenzofuran	92341-06-5	JZVOLXQREJNTTL-UHFFFAOYSA-N
PCDF-123689	C_{12}H_{2}Cl_{6}O	1,2,3,6,8,9-hexachlorodibenzofuran	75198-38-8	WLGQZUOHEXTWFH-UHFFFAOYSA-N
PCDF-123789	C_{12}H_{2}Cl_{6}O	1,2,3,7,8,9-hexachlorodibenzofuran	72918-21-9	PYUSJFJVDVSXIU-UHFFFAOYSA-N
PCDF-124678	C_{12}H_{2}Cl_{6}O	1,2,4,6,7,8-hexachlorodibenzofuran	67562-40-7	CKDDYGBBKXIHRY-UHFFFAOYSA-N
PCDF-124679	C_{12}H_{2}Cl_{6}O	1,2,4,6,7,9-hexachlorodibenzofuran	75627-02-0	FAHIPPHRJJJQOG-UHFFFAOYSA-N
PCDF-124689	C_{12}H_{2}Cl_{6}O	1,2,4,6,8,9-hexachlorodibenzofuran	69698-59-5	FGZCXIPKUCJGHW-UHFFFAOYSA-N
PCDF-134678	C_{12}H_{2}Cl_{6}O	1,3,4,6,7,8-hexachlorodibenzofuran	71998-75-9	OGTZINCGZYXZCR-UHFFFAOYSA-N
PCDF-134679	C_{12}H_{2}Cl_{6}O	1,3,4,6,7,9-hexachlorodibenzofuran	92341-05-4	TURXXOIFVABBPW-UHFFFAOYSA-N
PCDF-234678	C_{12}H_{2}Cl_{6}O	2,3,4,6,7,8-hexachlorodibenzofuran	60851-34-5	XTAHLACQOVXINQ-UHFFFAOYSA-N
PCDF-1234678	C_{12}HCl_{7}O	1,2,3,4,6,7,8-heptachlorodibenzofuran	67562-39-4	WDMKCPIVJOGHBF-UHFFFAOYSA-N
PCDF-1234679	C_{12}HCl_{7}O	1,2,3,4,6,7,9-heptachlorodibenzofuran	70648-25-8	JWXWOEUKHXOUSK-UHFFFAOYSA-N
PCDF-1234689	C_{12}HCl_{7}O	1,2,3,4,6,8,9-heptachlorodibenzofuran	69698-58-4	BADFHCOLISGRRW-UHFFFAOYSA-N
PCDF-1234789	C_{12}HCl_{7}O	1,2,3,4,7,8,9-heptachlorodibenzofuran	55673-89-7	VEZCTZWLJYWARH-UHFFFAOYSA-N
PCDF-12346789	C_{12}Cl_{8}O	octachlorodibenzofuran	39001-02-0	RHIROFAGUQOFLU-UHFFFAOYSA-N

== Safety, toxicity, regulation ==
Occupational exposure to PCDFs may occur through inhalation and contact with the skin, although intake even in workers at waste incineration plants is not particularly high. For general population the most important source is food of animal origin like with other dioxin-like compounds. The most relevant congener is 2,3,4,7,8-pentachlorodibenzofuran (2,3,4,7,8-PCDF) which is more toxic and based on relative toxicity more prevalent than other PCDFs.

== See also ==
- Dioxins and dioxin-like compounds
- Polychlorinated biphenyl

== Further resources ==
- Synopsis on dioxins and PCBs
- Chemical Profile: DIBENZOFURANS (CHLORINATED)
- NPI Polychlorinated dioxins and furans fact sheet
