= Dibenzofuran =

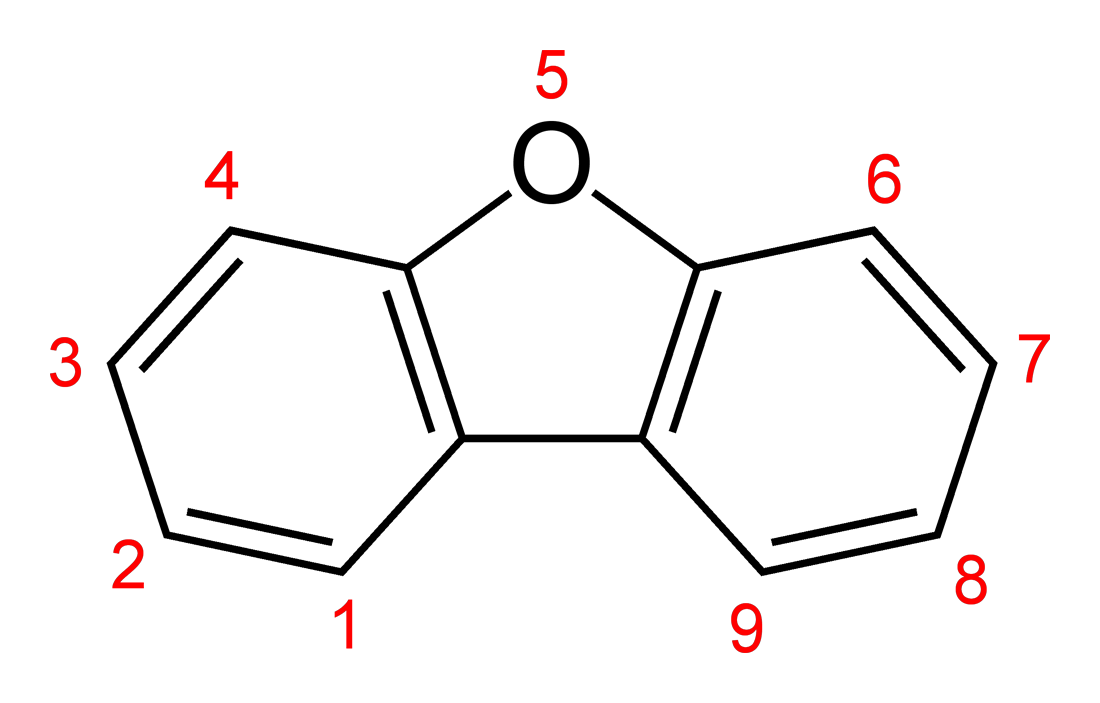

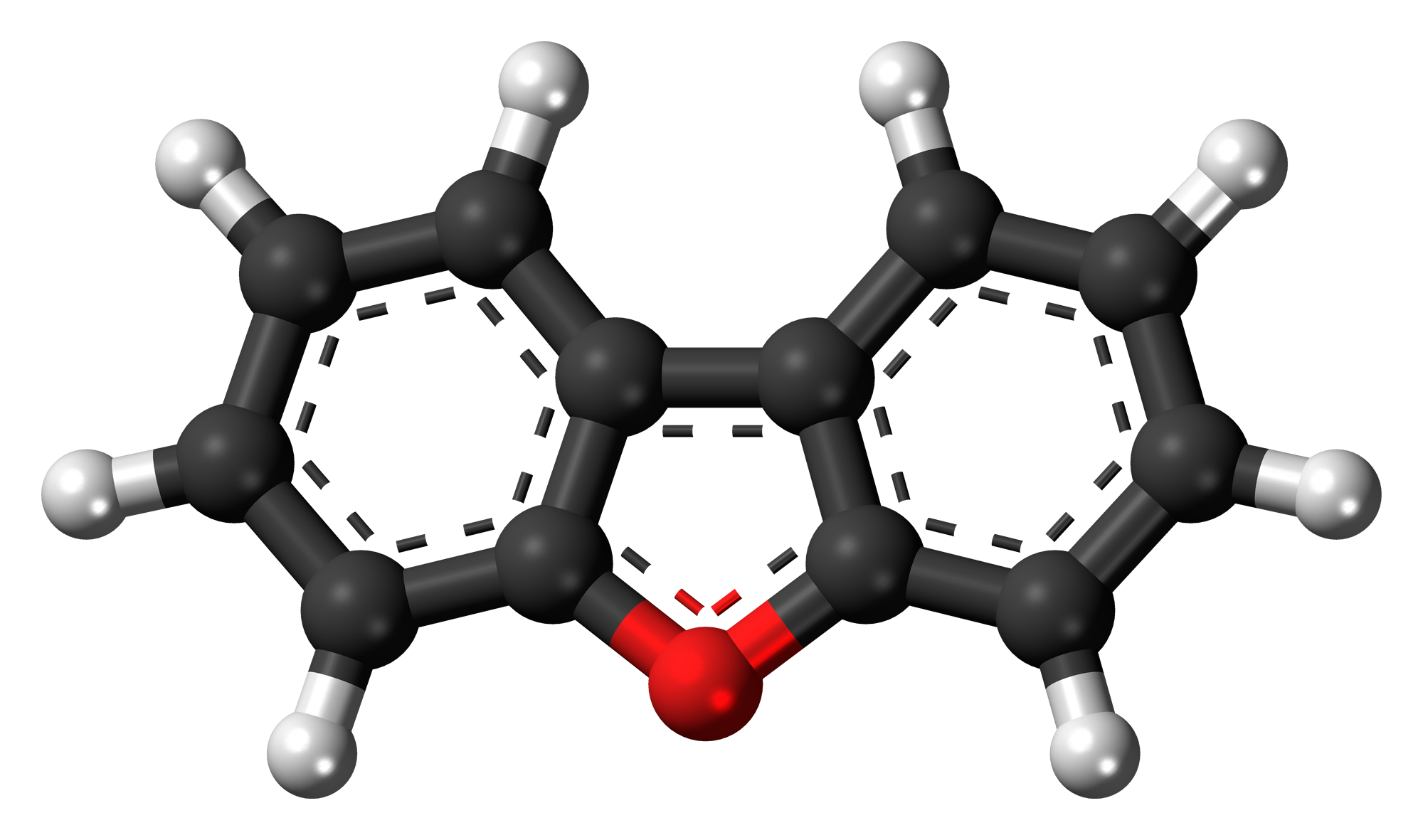

Names
- Preferred IUPAC name Dibenzo[b,d]furan

Identifiers
CAS Number	132-64-9
3D model (JSmol)	Interactive image
Beilstein Reference	121100
ChEBI	CHEBI:28145
ChEMBL	ChEMBL277497
ChemSpider	551
ECHA InfoCard	100.004.612
EC Number	205-071-3
Gmelin Reference	67825
KEGG	C07729
PubChem CID	568
UNII	8U54U639VI
UN number	3077
CompTox Dashboard (EPA)	DTXSID2021993
- InChI: InChI=1S/C12H8O/c1-3-7-11-9(5-1)10-6-2-4-8-12(10)13-11/h1-8H Key: TXCDCPKCNAJMEE-UHFFFAOYSA-N; InChI=1/C12H8O/c1-3-7-11-9(5-1)10-6-2-4-8-12(10)13-11/h1-8H Key: TXCDCPKCNAJMEE-UHFFFAOYAX
- SMILES: o2c1ccccc1c3c2cccc3

Properties
Chemical formula	C_{12}H_{8}O
Molar mass	168.19 g/mol
Appearance	white crystalline powder
Melting point	81 to 85 °C (178 to 185 °F; 354 to 358 K)
Boiling point	285 °C (545 °F; 558 K)
Solubility in water	Insoluble

Hazards
- GHS labelling
Pictograms	(GHS07: Exclamation mark) (GHS09: Environmental hazard)
Signal word	Warning
Hazard statements	H302, H312, H332, H411
Precautionary statements	P273, P391, P501

Related compounds
Related compounds	Furan; Benzofuran; Dibenzodioxin; Dibenzothiophene; Carbazole; Polyozellin (compound with a kernel with two dibenzofurans that share the same benzene ring)
- Except where otherwise noted, data are given for materials in their standard state (at 25 °C [77 °F], 100 kPa). verify (what is ?) Infobox references

Dibenzofuran (DBF) is a heterocyclic organic compound. It is an aromatic compound that has two benzene rings fused to a central furan ring. It is a volatile white solid that is soluble in non-polar organic solvents. It is obtained from coal tar, where it exists as a 1% component.

== Reactions ==
Dibenzofuran is thermally robust with a convenient liquid range. These properties, together with its low toxicity, are exploited by the use of DBF as a heat transfer agent.

It undergoes electrophilic reactions, such as halogenation and Friedel-Crafts reactions. Reaction of DBF with butyl lithium results in dilithiation.

Dibenzofuran is the precursor to the drug furobufen by Friedel-Crafts reaction with succinic anhydride.

== Safety ==
Dibenzofuran is a relatively non-toxic compound as evidenced by rats being unaffected after a 200-day diet consisting of 0.025 – 0.4% of DBF. The polychlorinated dibenzofurans are however among the potentially toxic dioxins and dioxin-like compounds.

Dibenzofuran is cited in the United States Clean Air Act 1990 Amendments -Hazardous Air Pollutants as a volatile hazardous air pollutant of potential concern. The Superfund Amendment Reauthorization Act (SARA) Section 110 placed dibenzofuran on the revised Agency for Toxic Substances and Disease Registry (ATSDR) priority list of hazardous substances to be the subject of a toxicological profile. The listing was based on the substance's frequency of occurrence at Comprehensive Environmental Response, Compensation, and Liability Act (CERCLA) National Priorities List sites, its toxicity, and/or its potential for human exposure.

== See also ==
- Benzofuran
