= Fenbufen =

Nonsteroidal anti-inflammatory drug, now withdrawn

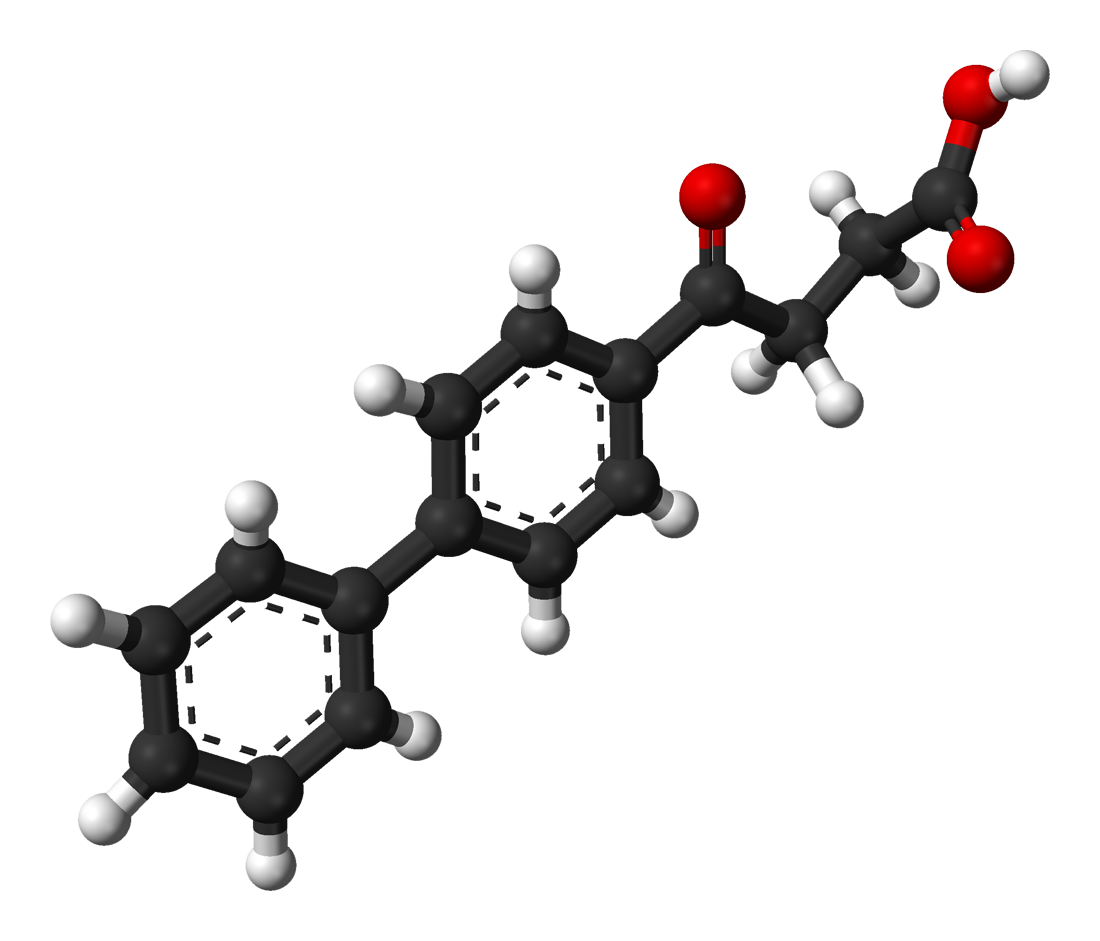

Clinical data
- AHFS/Drugs.com: International Drug Names
- Routes of administration: Oral
- ATC code: M01AE05 (WHO)

Legal status
- Legal status: UK: POM (Prescription only)

Identifiers
- IUPAC name: 4-(4-Biphenylyl)-4-oxobutanoic acid or 4-Oxo-4-(4-phenylphenyl)butanoic acid
- CAS Number: 36330-85-5
- PubChem CID: 3335
- DrugBank: DB08981
- ChemSpider: 3218
- UNII: 9815R1WR9B
- KEGG: D01344
- ChEBI: CHEBI:31599
- ChEMBL: ChEMBL277522
- CompTox Dashboard (EPA): DTXSID9023043
- ECHA InfoCard: 100.048.148

Chemical and physical data
- Formula: C_{16}H_{14}O_{3}
- Molar mass: 254.285 g·mol^{−1}
- 3D model (JSmol): Interactive image
- Melting point: 186 °C (367 °F)
- SMILES: O=C(O)CCC(=O)c2ccc(c1ccccc1)cc2
- InChI: InChI=1S/C16H14O3/c17-15(10-11-16(18)19)14-8-6-13(7-9-14)12-4-2-1-3-5-12/h1-9H,10-11H2,(H,18,19); Key:ZPAKPRAICRBAOD-UHFFFAOYSA-N

Fenbufen is a nonsteroidal anti-inflammatory drug used to treat pain.

Fenbufen is a member of the propionic acid derivatives class of drugs.

It was introduced by American Cyanamid under the trade name Lederfen in the 1980s. Due to liver toxicity, it was withdrawn from markets in the developed world in 2010.

As of 2015 it was available in Taiwan and Thailand under several brand names.

== Preparation ==
Fenbufen can be synthesized by acylation of biphenyl with succinic anhydride under Friedel-Crafts conditions.
