= Retention agent =

A retention agent is a chemical process that improves the retention of a functional chemical in a substrate. The result is that totally fewer chemicals are used to get the same effect as the functional chemical and fewer chemicals go to waste.

== Applications ==
Retention agents (retention aids) are used in the papermaking industry. These are added in the wet end of the paper machine to improve retention fine particles and fillers during the formation of paper. Retention aids can also be used to improve the retention of other papermaking chemicals, including sizing and cationic starches. The improved retention of papermaking furnish components improves the operational efficiency of the paper machine, reduces the solids and organic loading in the process water loop, and can lower overall chemical costs. Typical chemicals used as retention aids are: polyacrylamide (PAM), Polyethylenimine (PEI), colloidal silica, and bentonite.

Retention Agents or Retention Aids are often used along with the addition of drainage aids on paper machines. This is done because while retention is enhanced the forming fabrics get choked, resulting in slower removal of water from the paper web. Research done at a manufacturing laboratory in India signifies that over use of flocculants falling under this category can also result in problems during the runnability of machine.

== See also ==
- Colour retention agent
