= Isobutyryl chloride =

Names
- Preferred IUPAC name 2-Methylpropanoyl chloride
- Other names Isobutyroyl chloride

Identifiers
CAS Number	79-30-1
3D model (JSmol)	Interactive image
ChemSpider	56120
ECHA InfoCard	100.001.086
PubChem CID	62325
UNII	6617F0VJZC
CompTox Dashboard (EPA)	DTXSID0052542
- InChI: InChI=1S/C4H7ClO/c1-3(2)4(5)6/h3H,1-2H3 Key: DGMOBVGABMBZSB-UHFFFAOYSA-N
- SMILES: CC(C)C(=O)Cl

Properties
Chemical formula	C_{4}H_{7}ClO
Molar mass	106.55 g·mol^{−1}
Density	1.017 g/mL
Melting point	−90 °C
Boiling point	91–93 °C (196–199 °F; 364–366 K)
- Except where otherwise noted, data are given for materials in their standard state (at 25 °C [77 °F], 100 kPa). Infobox references

Isobutyryl chloride (2-methylpropanoyl chloride) is the organic compound with the formula (CH_{3})_{2}CHCOCl. A colorless liquid, it the simplest branched-chain acyl chloride. It is prepared by chlorination of isobutyric acid.

== Reactions ==
As an ordinary acid chloride, isobutyryl chloride is the subject of many reported transformations. Dehydrohalogenation of isobutyryl chloride with triethylamine gives 2,2,4,4-tetramethylcyclobutanedione. Treatment of isobutyryl chloride with hydrogen fluoride gives the acid fluoride.
