= NNC 38-1049 =

Names
- Preferred IUPAC name 1-(4-Chlorophenyl)-4-(4-cyclopentylpiperazin-1-yl)butane-1,4-dione

Identifiers
CAS Number	757183-18-9
3D model (JSmol)	Interactive image
ChEMBL	ChEMBL97170
ChemSpider	7974195
PubChem CID	9798429
UNII	63G6TLD54V
CompTox Dashboard (EPA)	DTXSID70430911
- InChI: InChI=1S/C19H25ClN2O2/c20-16-7-5-15(6-8-16)18(23)9-10-19(24)22-13-11-21(12-14-22)17-3-1-2-4-17/h5-8,17H,1-4,9-14H2 Key: VPARRMQGLNFBBR-UHFFFAOYSA-N; InChI=1/C19H25ClN2O2/c20-16-7-5-15(6-8-16)18(23)9-10-19(24)22-13-11-21(12-14-22)17-3-1-2-4-17/h5-8,17H,1-4,9-14H2 Key: VPARRMQGLNFBBR-UHFFFAOYAT
- SMILES: Clc1ccc(cc1)C(=O)CCC(=O)N3CCN(C2CCCC2)CC3

Properties
Chemical formula	C_{19}H_{25}ClN_{2}O_{2}
Molar mass	348.866 g/mol
- Except where otherwise noted, data are given for materials in their standard state (at 25 °C [77 °F], 100 kPa). verify (what is ?) Infobox references

NNC 38-1049 is a histamine antagonist selective for the H_{3} subtype. It has anorectic effects in animal studies and is being researched as a potential treatment for obesity.
