= Monogenic obesity =

Obesity caused by a mutation in a single gene

Monogenic obesity is excess weight caused by a mutation in a single gene. It differs from syndromic obesity, which involves additional clinical phenotypes such as neurodevelopmental delay or dysmorphic features, and from the more common polygenic obesity, which results from both genetic and environmental risk factors. Monogenetic obesity mostly affects the hypothalamus and leptin–melanocortin system (see hypothalamic obesity), and accounts for less than 5 percent of severe obesity cases.

Key features that differentiate monogenic obesity from polygenic obesity include hyperphagia, extreme symptoms of obesity and the early onset of obesity. It is a rare, early-onset form of obesity that follows a Mendelian pattern of inheritance. Most cases arise from alterations in a single gene of the leptin-melanocortin pathway, a key regulatory system controlling body weight, hunger, and energy expenditure. Research on monogenic obesity has focused on characterizing its clinical features, establishing diagnostic criteria, and developing therapeutic approaches, with case studies across diverse populations to improve understanding and management of the condition.

Known mutations leading to monogenetic obesity include:

- Leptin deficiency
- Leptin receptor deficiency
- Melanocortin-4 receptor (MC4R)
- Proopiomelanocortin (POMC)
- Prohormone convertase 1/3 (PC1/3)
- SIM1
- BDNF
- NTRK2

== History of Monogenic Obesity ==
The genetic basis of monogenic obesity was first established in 1994 by Jeffery Friedman and colleagues at The Rockefeller University. Jeffery Freidman and colleagues' discovery of the leptin-encoding obese gene (Ob) establishes that genetic factors are a crucial influence for obesity, allowing for a series of corresponding discoveries that expanded on the influence of single-mutated genes in obesity.

In 1997, two separate reported cases of monogenic obesity were published, observing a pair of cousins who are the only family members reported to have severe early-onset obesity. Carl Montague and colleagues, as well as Robert Jackson and colleagues at the University of Cambridge, observed severe obesity phenotypes associated with single-gene variants involving the leptin-melanocortin pathway. Montague et al. observed undetectable concentrations of leptin and hyperphagia, and found that both cousins had a homozygous frame-shift variant in the Ob gene. Jackson et al. provided a secondary report that the early-onset obesity phenotypes were associated with single-gene variation in the gene encoding prohormone convertase 1 (PCSK1). Their findings established that single genes existed that could directly influence severe human obesity when mutated. Since the discovery, researchers have identified several more genes with variants that can cause monogenic obesity.

A key note is that murine models aid significantly in our current understanding of monogenic human obesity, as most murine genes identified through monogenic variant studies have their corresponding human homologs.

== Overview of Leptin-Melanocortin pathway ==
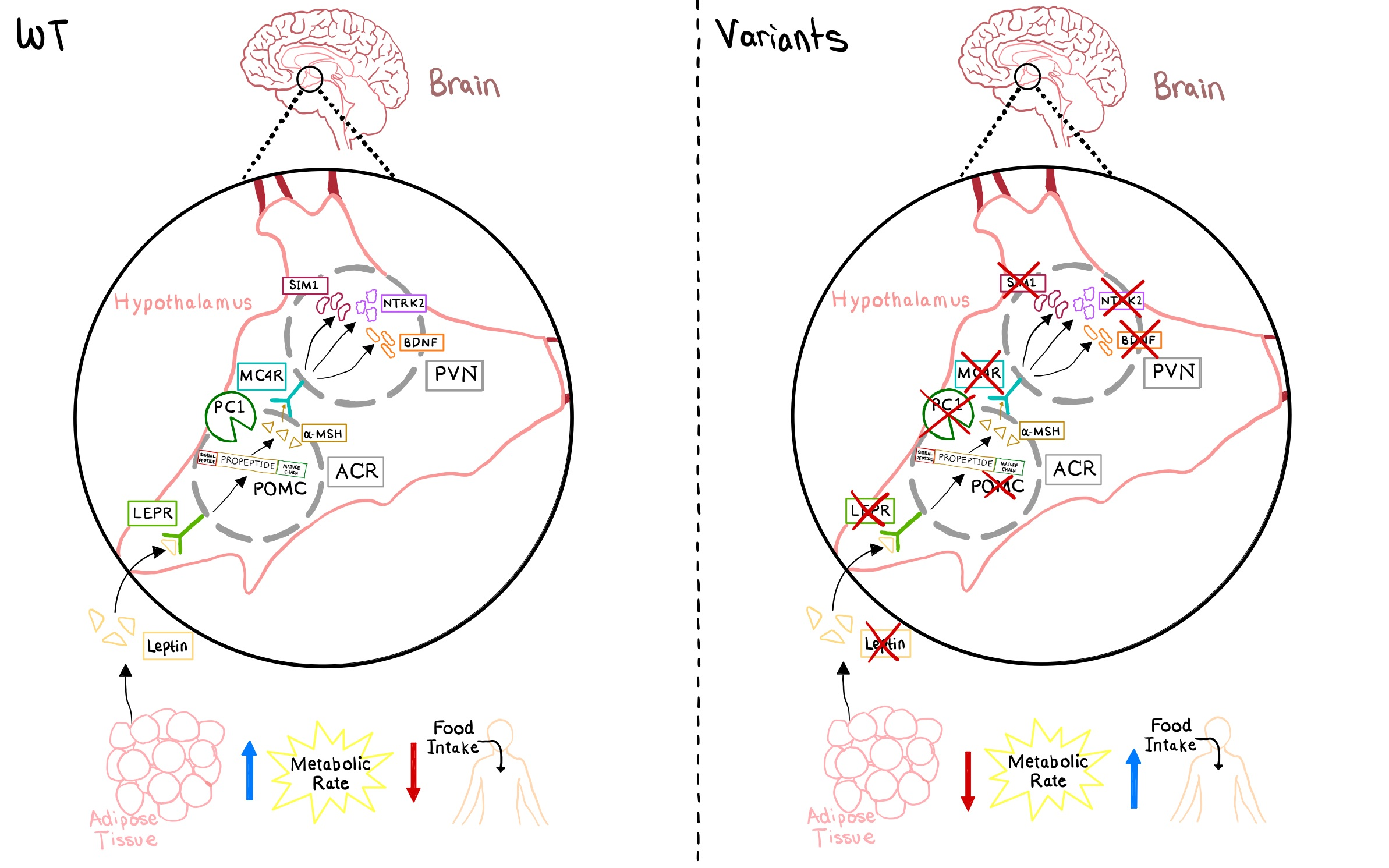
Leptin-melanocortin pathway schematic showing results under normal conditions (left) and in the presence of monogenic variations to components in the pathway( right). Adipose tissues release leptin that binds to the Leptin Receptor (LEPR) on the proopiomelanocortin neurons (POMC) in the arcuate nucleus (ACR) of the hypothalamus. The leptin stimulates POMC processing with prohormone convertase 1 (PC1) to generate alpha-melanocyte-stimulating hormone (𝛼-MSH) that binds to melanocortin-4 receptors (MC4R) and signals the paraventricular nucleus (PVN). The PVN initiates a signalling cascade and activates downstream components such as Single-minded 1 transcription factor (SIM1), a Neurotrophic Tyrosine Kinase Receptor Type 2 (NTRK2) and Brain-Derived Neurotrophic Factors (BDNF), all of which can influence metabolic rate and food intake.

Leptin, a hormone secreted by adipose tissue and encoded by the Ob gene, is released into the bloodstream during the 'fed state' and crosses the blood brain barrier. Leptin binds to the leptin receptor expressed on the surface of proopiomelanocortin (POMC) neurons in the arcuate nucleus of the hypothalamus. This activates POMC processing by proprotein convertase 1(PC1) into Α-Melanocyte-stimulating hormone (α-MSH). α-MSH is then released and acts on melanocortin 4 receptor (MC4R) in downstream hypothalamic regions, including the paraventricular nucleus. Activation of MC4R neurons initiates a signaling cascade that ultimately reduces food intake and increases energy expenditure.

== Leptin ==
=== WT vs Variants ===
Adipocytes secrete Leptin, a peptide hormone encoded from the obese gene (ob), also known as the leptin gene (LEP). It is a principal regulator of fat mass and is integral in the regulation of fuel stores and energy balance, while signalling the body's nutritional status to peripheral tissues for modulated functions. Studies in mice suggest that leptin commonly regulates many peripheral tissues in humans, such as a mitogenic influence on CD4+ T cells, the circulation of thyrotropin-releasing hormone (TRH) that regulates metabolism, the regulation of the onset of puberty, and the neuroendocrine restriction responses to food.

Homozygosity for loss-of-function variants of LEP attributes to Leptin deficiency. In a case study of a Turkish family with obese family members, the homozygosity for LEP variants results in a C to T substitution at codon 105, leading to an Arg to Trp amino acid change. In another case study, researchers attributed the early-onset obesity in two Pakistani children to a frameshift mutation in LEP that deleted a guanine nucleotide at codon 133. In the case of both families, other family members who were heterozygous for the variation or homozygous for the WT allele did not display any phenotypes associated with obesity.

=== Phenotypic Effects ===
Leptin deficiency results in a range of symptoms including increased body mass index, infertility, delayed onset of puberty, cold intolerance, lower energy expenditures and intense hyperphagia. Increased body mass index is observed in mice and the Pakistani and Turkish case studies, where mice grew to three times the size of the wild type and subjects were born at normal weight, then rapidly increased in weight at an early age. Initially, researchers did not observe infertility due to leptin deficiency, as case studies such as the Pakistani family consisted only of young children. However, infertility is now displayed in the Turkish family as the adult subjects present hypothalamic–pituitary hormone insufficiency due to leptin deficiency and have never gone into puberty. Cold intolerance is also observed in both the mice and the Turkish subjects when exposed to cold conditions. Lastly, a consistent symptom of leptin deficiency across mice and subjects in many case studies is intense hyperphagia and lower energy expenditures.

=== Treatment ===
Subcutaneous recombinant human leptin therapy is a prevalent treatment option for leptin-deficient patients. Researchers observe positive results from the therapy, including an intense loss of fat mass through decreasing food consumption, an increase in basal metabolic activity and lower serum insulin/cholesterol levels. An increase in the proportion of CD4+ T helper cells is also observed. Another study suggests that leptin therapy has the greatest impact on decreased food intake, while other factors, such as energy expenditure, do increase but do not play as much of a role.

== Leptin Receptor ==
=== WT vs Variants ===
The leptin receptor (LEPR) is a transmembrane protein with an extracellular domain that binds leptin. Its function is mediated by leptin, regulating energy stores, hypothalamic function, and neuroendocrine signaling. Mutational analysis demonstrates that a functional leptin receptor is essential for proper regulation of body weight, sexual maturation, and endocrine hormone secretion.

Mutations that produce a secreted, truncated form of the receptor—lacking transmembrane and intracellular domains—are defective in signal transduction but retain the leptin-binding ectodomain Because the mutant leptin receptor is secreted into the bloodstream rather than anchored in the membrane, it binds and sequesters circulating leptin, increasing total serum leptin levels while preventing effective signaling to the brain, thereby contributing to leptin resistance

=== Phenotypic Effects ===
In a UK-based study of 300 severely obese, hyperphagic probands, researchers identified LEPR loss-of-function mutations in eight individuals from diverse backgrounds, including Bangladeshi, Turkish, Iranian, Southern European, Norwegian, and White UK descent. All affected individuals exhibited early-onset obesity, hyperphagia, and increased ad libitum energy intake, though there was no major deficit in energy expenditure. Vertical growth and Insulin-like growth factor 1 levels during childhood were normal, but adult height was reduced due to a lack of pubertal growth spurt. Adults exhibited hypogonadism and reduced secondary sex characteristics, along with low sex-steroid levels, Follicle-stimulating hormone, and Luteinizing hormone levels. However, uterine development in adult females was observed, and hormonal levels during the follicular phase were still within the normal range, suggesting that activation of the hypothalamic-pituitary gland was still possible, albeit delayed. Heterozygotes undergo puberty normally and demonstrate normal reproductive functions. Subjects also had reduced CD4+ T cells, but in compensation had higher amounts of B lymphocytes . Surprisingly, the overall clinical phenotype of subjects with leptin receptor deficiency is not as severe as those with leptin deficiency, despite similar phenotypes observed in mice harboring mutations in leptin or its receptor.

== Melanocortin-4 receptor (MC4R) ==
=== WT vs Variants ===
The melanocortin-4 receptor (MC4R) is a 332-amino acid protein essential for the central regulation of long-term energy. Central regulation consists of regulating food intake and integrating a satiety signal provided to the MC4R from the agonist α-MSH and an orexigenic signal provided by its antagonist agouti-related peptide (AGRP). MC4R is a G protein-coupled receptor (GPCR) in the paraventricular nucleus of the hypothalamus, and when activated, it transduces a signal to regulate appetite and decrease or increase food intake.

Mutations to the MC4R are the most frequent cause of severe monogenic obesity. MC4R mutation can be codominant, and rarer homozygous mutants result in more severe obesity symptoms than heterozygote carriers. There are variations of mutations that can occur and are continuously studied to differentiate between the severity and phenotypes of each mutation. A study of 289 obese Czech children identified a novel missense mutation, Cys84Arg, as well as 5 previously reported variants: Arg7Cys, Ser19fsdelA, Phe51Leu, Ser127Leu, and Gly181Asp. Another study with 300 Chinese children (200 obese and 100 unaffected) also found novel heterozygous non-synonymous (Val166Ile; Arg310Lys) and nonsense (Cys277Stop) mutations in obese Chinese children. Depending on the type of mutation, the effect is either a partial or complete loss of function in MC4R and may also cause intracellular retention of the MC4R. Intracellular retention appears to provide the most severe obesity phenotypes and earlier age onset, even in comparison to complete loss of function mutations.

=== Phenotypic Effects ===
MC4R deficiency has common symptoms that involve early-onset obesity, increased bone mineral density, hyperinsulinemia, hyperphagia and increased linear growth in children. However, many studies have shown that the severity and range of symptoms observed depend on the specific type of mutation. Individuals with rare homozygous mutations, resulting in severely reduced MC4R function, tend to exhibit more symptoms and greater dysregulation of body weight compared to heterozygous carriers.

== Pro-opiomelanocortin (POMC) ==
=== WT vs Variants ===
POMC is a precursor protein that upon proteolytic cleavage yields melanocortin peptides including adrenocorticotropic hormone (ACTH), melanocyte-stimulating hormones (MSH), and opioid-receptor ligand Β-Endorphin. These peptides serve diverse roles such as controlling adrenal growth and skin pigmentation through binding to their corresponding melanocortin receptors (MCRs). α-MSH binds to and activates MC3R and MC4R to regulate body weight, pituitary-derived ACTH interacts with the adrenal MC2R to regulate cortisol secretion, and paracrine MSH peptides bind to MC1 receptor to regulate coat pigmentation.

The first two reported cases of POMC deficiency involved a patient who was a compound heterozygote for two exon mutations (G7013T in the paternal allele and C7133∆ in the maternal allele), and another patient who was homozygous for a mutation in exon 2 (C3804A) that abolished translation of POMC. Although the ethnicities of these 2 patients were not directly disclosed in the study, they are likely of European descent given the prevalence and geographic distribution of the C3804A mutation. Three additional cases in European children included a male patient from Slovenia with decreased adrenal gland size and very low serum cortical and ACTH levels, a Dutch male diagnosed with central hypocortisolism, and a Swiss female diagnosed with hypoglycemia due to ACTH deficiency. Another reported case of human POMC deficiency involved a Turkish patient who was homozygous for a deletion mutation (C6906del) resulting in the loss of all POMC-derived peptides.

=== Phenotypic Effects ===
Complete loss-of-function mutations of POMC results in the clinical phenotype of complete POMC deficiency with non-detectable levels of plasma cortisol and ACTH, early-onset and severe obesity, and hypercortisolism. All aforementioned patients developed extreme obesity within the first year of life with reports of hyperphagic behavior. Five of the six European patients exhibited red hair, whereas the Turkish patient had brown hair. This difference suggests that darker-haired ethnic groups may carry other genetic variants that maintain eumelanin synthesis in the absence of POMC-derived ligands, while lighter-haired northern European groups may depend more heavily on such ligands.

Significant higher prevalence of obesity observed in heterozygote carriers compared to wild type suggests that loss of one POMC allele is sufficient to increase risk of obesity.

=== Treatment ===
As life-threatening symptoms from secondary hypercortisolemia can appear as early as during the neonatal period of POMC-deficient patients, there is a time window for timely intervention with hydrocortisone replacement therapy. Otherwise, fatality may result as seen in a first-born son of a family with POMC deficiency who died because of hepatic failure before hypocortisolism could be diagnosed.

== Prohormone convertase 1/3 (PC1/3) ==
=== WT vs Variants ===
Prohormone convertase 1/3 (PC1/3) is an enzyme involved in the regulation of energy balance through leptin. Several proneuropeptides or prohormone, such as pro-TRH, pro-opiomelanocortin, proinsulin, and progonadotropin, require cleavage at the C-terminal basic residues. Carboxypeptidase E (Cp3) is responsible for the prohormone/propeptide cleavage at the C-terminal. The post-translational cleavage regulation required for energy balance relies on PC1/3. Studies hypothesize that PC1/3 works upstream of Cp3 to regulate its cleavage activity and activate proneurohormones into prominent mature proteins that work in the anterior pituitary, hypothalamus and/or skin.

PC1/3 deficiency is an autosomal recessive disorder that causes obesity. One case study observed a woman with two different mutant alleles: a Gly483Arg mutation leading to ER retention failure and a splice site mutation in intron 5 (A→C+4), resulting in a frameshift and creation of a premature stop codon within the catalytic domain. Mutations in PC1/3 prevent the critical post-translational regulation, thus resulting in impaired prohormone processing that has many downstream impacts affecting energy regulation. Very few cases of PC1/3 deficiency are reported, and often, obesity is not the most prominent phenotype, suggesting that PC1/3 deficiency is rare in diagnosing monogenic obesity.

=== Phenotypic Effects ===
PC1/3 deficiency has several syndromes, including childhood-onset obesity, hypoglycemia, hypogonadotropic hypogonadism, severe postnatal growth, and elevated proinsulin, all due to impaired post-transplantation prohormone processing of key regulatory genes.

== Single-minded homolog 1 (S1M1) ==
=== WT vs Variants ===
SIM1 is a transcription factor crucial for the development of the paraventricular nucleus (PVN) of the hypothalamus in mice, which is an integration center for appetite and energy expenditure. Mutational studies of its mouse homologs SIM1 and SIM2 indicate that these genes are important for regulating the terminal differentiation of several cell types, emphasizing its critical role in neuroendocrine function.

A study of an 18-month-old girl revealed a balanced translocation between the short arm of chromosome 1 and the long arm of chromosome 7, where only the SIM1 gene on 6q was affected. She carried a C→T substitution only on one of her SIM1 alleles, demonstrating heterozygosity and haploinsufficiency for the loss-of-function mutation suggesting that SIM1-mediated monogenic obesity may follow an autosomal dominant pattern of inheritance.

=== Phenotypic Effects ===
In mice, homozygous Sim1 knockout was lethal, likely due to failure of PVN development, while heterozygous mice live but develop early-onset obesity, increased linear growth, hyperinsulinemia, hyperleptinemia, and hyperphagia in the absence of a decrease in energy expenditure.

In humans, a de novo balanced translocation between chromosomes 1 and 7 leading to a deletion mutation in SIM1 has been associated with severe obesity, increased linear growth, and elevated serum leptin levels. Her rate of weight gain was comparable to phenotypes associated with leptin or leptin receptor mutations. Notably, these findings are consistent with those of Sim1 heterozygous mice, where hyperphagia without decreased energy expenditure suggests that increased food intake is the primary driver for obesity.

A 21-month-old white male from the US with a novel SIM1 mutation resulted in early-onset obesity and hypopituitarism according to the results of his endocrine workup. Although the mutation was maternally inherited, the mother herself exhibited mild obesity at a much later timepoint in life, suggesting variable expressivity due to additional genetic or environmental factors.

=== Treatment ===
In cases of hypopituitarism, as in the case with the 21 month old male, treatment with levothyroxine, hydrocortisone, and desmopressin is required to restore and maintain pituitary hormone levels within an appropriate range.

== Brain-Derived Neurotrophic Factor (BDNF) ==
=== WT vs Variants ===
Brain-derived neurotrophic factor (BDNF) belongs to the neurotrophin family. The neurotrophin is synthesized as a prohormone that is then cleaved by prohormone convertase. Studies of adult rat brains show that BDNF mRNA is commonly expressed in the hippocampus, septum, cortex and the hypothalamic nuclei associated with satiety and locomotor activities. It is inferred that BDNF may enter neurons to directly influence transcription as well as control eating behaviour through signals of satiety, inhibiting food intake. Therefore, the role of BDNF is to maintain energy homeostasis through regulating food intake as well as cognitive functions, memory and behaviour, likely working downstream of MC4R.

Studies of mice show that when BDNF is mutated, the disrupted neurotrophin results in increased food intake and obesity in mice. Further, when various heterozygous mice had targeted disruption of proteins involved in the neurotrophin pathway, such as BDNF, NT-4/5 or TrkA, only BDNF mutants had significant increases in weight compared to WT. A case study with an eight-year-old girl displayed a chromosomal inversion in the BDNF gene, along with the presence of a common polymorphism. When compared to other individuals of the same age and BMI, the girl displayed reduced serum BDNF levels and gained weight much faster than others, becoming obese at the age of eight.

=== Phenotypic Effects ===
Common symptoms associated with BDNF mutations involved intense hyperphagia, severe obesity, impaired cognitive functions such as memory and nociception and hyperactivity.

=== Treatment ===
Various therapeutic approaches are under research involving stimulating the transcription of BDNF or restoring BDNF levels, but there has been no clear therapeutic solution yet. A study has hypothesized that infusion with BDNF may reverse the inability to regulate food intake and prevent obesity, although the results are only transient.

== Neurotrophic Receptor Tyrosine Kinase 2 (NTRK2) ==
=== WT vs Variants ===
NTRK2 is part of the TRK family of receptor tyrosine kinases that are activated by neurotrophins. Neurotrophin signaling through these receptors regulate various functions such as cell survival and proliferation, with the NTRK2-BDNF interaction specifically serving important roles in regulating mammalian eating behavior and energy balance. TRKs contain cytoplasmic domains that have phosphorylation sites capable of recruiting intermediates for further signal transduction. Infusing MC4R deficient mice with BDNF suppressed the increased food intake and weight gain, suggesting that NTRK2 acts downstream of MC4R.

A child with severe early onset obesity and hyperphagia was found to be a heterozygote for a de novo loss of function mutation in NTRK2 where an A to G transition occurred in codon 722.

=== Phenotypic Effects ===
Despite normal birth weight, the child harboring the Y722C mutation gained weight rapidly from an age of 6 months. He was also reported to be hyperphagic and also exhibited increased linear growth throughout childhood. The Y722C mutation impaired ligand-induced phosphorylation and impairment of MAPK phosphorylation, a signaling pathway downstream of the receptor.

A subsequent functional characterization of the Y722C mutation showed that in addition to loss of signaling, this mutation impairs the ability of NTRK2 to promote neurite outgrowth in response to the addition of BDNF. This suggests that the severe hyperphagic and obesity seen in this individual can be mechanistically explained by impaired hypothalamic neurogenesis.

== Therapeutic Considerations ==
Lifecycle Modification Therapies

Individuals with monogenic obesity often experience social stigma due to hyperphagic behaviors, which can affect psychological and social wellbeing. Establishing a limited yet reasonable and consistent eating routine has been associated with reduced impulsivity that triggers food-seeking behavior.

Sustained multicomponent lifestyle interventions and support have also been highly beneficial. For example, children with MC4R deficiency who received nutritional, physical, psychological, and family intervention for one year lost as much weight as matched obese children without MC4R variations, with an average reduction of approximately 0.4 BMI standard deviation scores. These findings suggest that supportive behavior and environmental interventions can contribute to improved management of patients with monogenic obesity.

Pharmacological treatment targeting the leptin-melanocortin pathway in monogenic obesity. Metreleptin is a recombinant leptin analog with a longer half-life than endogenous leptin and is typically delivered once daily via subcutaneous injection. Setmelanotide is a melanocortin-4 receptor (MC4R) agonist and can effectively bypass upstream defects caused by Leptin Receptor (LEPR), proopiomelanocortin (POMC), Prohormone convertase (PCSK1), or Single-minded homolog 1 (SIM1) deficiencies by directly activating MC4R.

Pharmacological Treatment:

Genetic advances have enabled the development of new therapeutic drugs that may be prescribed for more than one variation of monogenic obesity by targeting the common leptin-melanocortin pathway. For instance, patients with leptin deficiency treated with recombinant leptin (metreleptin), exhibited drastic weight loss and normalization of metabolic and neuroendocrine function. Patients with monogenic obesity due to POMC, PCSK1, or leptin receptor deficiency who were treated with setmelanotide, an MC4R agonist mimicking the POMC-derived alpha-MSH resulted in drastic decrease of body weight and reduction of hunger.

Bariatric Surgery:

Bariatric surgery such as Sleeve Gastrectomy (SG) or Roux-en-Y gastric bypass (RYGB) may be considered in cases of extreme severity, as interventions result in sustained weight reduction in patients with complicated severe obesity.
