= Single-minded =

Single-minded may refer to:

== Psychology ==
- Attention or focus
- Attentional control
- Determination
- Open-mindedness, receptivity to new ideas, contrasted with closed-mindedness

== Religion ==
- Double-mindedness, a concept developed by Søren Kierkegaard from Christian tradition
- Ekaggata, a Buddhist term meaning tranquillity of mind or onepointedness
- James 1, a passage in the Christian Bible discussing double-mindedness

== Science ==
- Single-minded (sim), a protein-coding gene in Drosophila, or its mammalian homologs SIM1 and SIM2
