= C19H12O2 =

The molecular formula C_{19}H_{12}O_{2} (molar mass: 272.30 g/mol) may refer to:

- α-Naphthoflavone (7,8-benzoflavone)
- β-Naphthoflavone (5,6-benzoflavone)
