= Brenda Bloodgood =

American neuroscientist

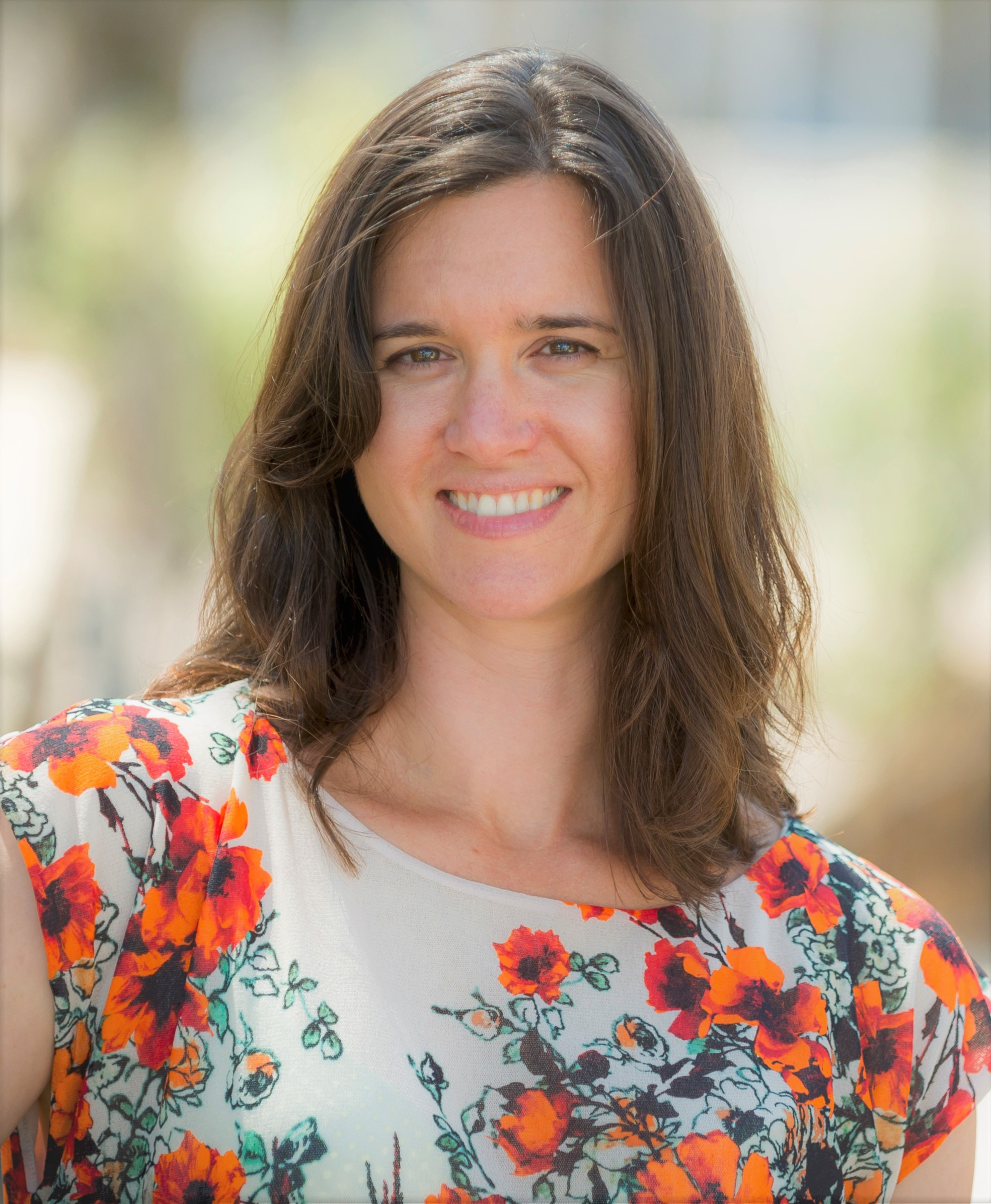
- Education: University of California San Diego, Harvard University
- Known for: Role of Npas4 in modulating synaptic physiology
- Awards: 2015 NIH Director’s New Innovator Award, 2015 Pew Biomedical Scholar, 2014 Searle Scholar, 2011-2012 Charles A. King Trust Postdoctoral Fellowship, 2010-2011 L’Oreal Fellowship for Women in Science
- Scientific career
- Fields: Neuroscience
- Workplaces: University of California San Diego

Brenda Bloodgood is an American neuroscientist and associate professor of neurobiology at the University of California, San Diego. Bloodgood studies the molecular and cellular basis of brain circuitry changes in response to an animal's interactions with the environment.

== Early life and education ==
In highschool, Bloodgood participated in Columbia University’s Science Honors Program. The opportunity to asking questions and formulate scientific hypotheses in this program inspired her to pursue a career in neuroscience. After highschool, Bloodgood attended a community college in California and then transferred to the University of California, San Diego to complete an undergraduate degree in Animal Physiology and Neuroscience. While at UCSD, Bloodgood joined the lab of Dr. Ed Callaway at the Salk Institute for Biological Studies as an undergraduate research assistant. After receiving her bachelors of science degree in 2001, Bloodgood continued on a path towards academic neuroscience by completing her PhD at Harvard Medical School. As a graduate student at Harvard, Bloodgood studied under the mentorship of Dr. Bernardo Sabatini. Bloodgood's graduate work focusing on synaptic physiology led to a first author paper in the academic journal Science regarding how neuronal activity regulates diffusion across the neck of dendritic spines. After completing graduate school in 2006, Bloodgood remained Boston to complete her postdoctoral studies under the mentorship of Dr. Mike Greenberg at Harvard Medical School. In the Greenberg Lab, Bloodgood studied the protein Npas4 which is known to regulate neuronal gene expression specifically at inhibitory synapses. In her postdoc, Bloodgood explored the underlying mechanisms governing how Npas4 regulates the number and formation of inhibitory inputs onto neurons. Bloodgood discovered that upon sensory stimulation, Npas4 mediates a rearrangement of the distribution of inhibitory synapses onto hippocampal neurons restricting information output while increasing the potential for dendritic plasticity. This essentially increases the ability of a neuron to gather more information before relaying it further throughout the circuit.

== Career and research ==
Bloodgood completed her postdoctoral studies in 2012 and then returned to her undergraduate alma mater, the University of California, San Diego, to start her own neurobiology lab within the Division of Biological Sciences. Inspired by her postdoctoral work, Bloodgood has focused her lab's research program on probing a deeper understanding of the diverse functions of Npas4 in modulating neural computations and driving changes in animal behavior. Just two years after starting her lab, Bloodgood and 2 other UCSD scientists received funding from Obama’s BRAIN Initiative in 2014.

In 2016, Bloodgood became the co-director of the San Diego Brain Consortium, an organization which helps to coordinate collaborations, build research training programs, enhance science communication, and generally foster innovation in brain research. Bloodgood also serves as an Advisory Board Member and Faculty Fellow for the Kavli Institute for Brain and Mind at UCSD.

Recently, the Bloodgood Lab found that there are functional differences between the NMDA receptors on spines versus dendritic synaptic inputs onto Parvalbumin interneurons in the mouse cortex. Further, the Bloodgood Lab discovered that Npas4 is induced by action potentials through a completely different mechanism than when Npas4 is induced by excitatory postsynaptic potentials. While both action potential induced and EPSP induced Npas4 yield Npas4 heterodimers, these heterodimers remarkably have distinct effects on gene expression and regulation.

In 2024, a paper from Bloodgood's lab in Cell Journal was retracted after reports of manipulated data. The paper's first author Gian-Stefano Brigidi, admitted to falsifying images and fabricating experiments, and multiple investigations — by UCSD, the University of Utah, and the U.S. Office of Research Integrity — concluded that he had engaged in research misconduct. Although the fraudulent acts were carried out by Brigidi, as the principal investigator, Bloodgood bore ultimate responsibility for the integrity of work published under her lab’s name. She co-signed the retraction notice and took the difficult steps of notifying NIH, the journal, and institutional leadership, while also leading her trainees through the scientific and personal fallout of the scientific misconduct.

== Awards ==
- 2015 NIH Director's New Innovator Award
- 2015 Pew Biomedical Scholar
- 2014 Searle Scholar
- 2011-2012 Charles A. King Trust Postdoctoral Fellowship
- 2010-2011 L’Oreal Fellowship for Women in Science
- 2009-2010 Dorsett L. Spurgeon Distinguished Research Award
- 2008-2011 Helen Hay Whitney Postdoctoral Fellowship
- 2007-2008 Ruth L. Kirschstein National Research Service Award, NS007484- 07
- 2006 Harold M. Weintraub Graduate Student Dissertation Award

== Publications ==
- Andrea L Hartzell, Kelly M Martyniuk, G Stefano Brigidi, Daniel A Heinz, Nathalie A Djaja, Anja Payne, Brenda L Bloodgood. NPAS4 recruits CCK basket cell synapses and enhances cannabinoid-sensitive inhibition in the mouse hippocampus. eLife 2018;7:e35927 doi:10.7554/eLife.35927
- Laura Sancho, Brenda L. Bloodgood. Functional Distinctions between Spine and Dendritic Synapses Made onto Parvalbumin-Positive Interneurons in Mouse Cortex. Cell Reports. Volume 24. Issue 8, 2018. Pages 2075–2087. ISSN 2211-1247, doi:10.1016/j.celrep.2018.07.070.
- Bloodgood, B.L.*, Sharma, N.*, Browne, H.A., Trepman, A.Z., Greenberg, M.E., Domain-specific regulation of inhibitory synapses by the activity-dependent transcription factor Npas4, Nature, 2013 Nov 7. 503(7474):121-5.
- Greer, P. L., Hanayama, R., Bloodgood, B. L., Flavell, S.W., Mardinly, A.R., Lipton, D.M., Kim, TK., Griffith, E.C., Waldon, Z., Maehr, R., Ploegh, H. L., Chowdhury, S., Worley, P. F., Steen, J., Greenberg, M. E. (2010). The AngelmanSyndrome-associated ubiquitin ligase Ube3a regulates synapse development and function through the ubiquination of Arc. Cell 140:704-716.
- Bloodgood B. L., Giessel A. J., Sabatini B. L. (2009). Biphasic synaptic Ca influx arising from compartmentalized electrical signals in dendritic spines. PLoS Biol. 7:e1000190.
- Lin Y., Bloodgood B.L., Hauser J.L., Lapan A.D., Koon A.C., Kim T.K., Hu L.S., Malik A.N., Greenberg M.E. (2008). Activity-dependent regulation of inhibitory synapse development by Npas4. Nature 455:1198-1204.
- Bloodgood, B.L., and Sabatini B.L. (2008). Regulation of synaptic signaling by postsynaptic, non-glutamate receptor ion channels. J. Physiol. 586:1475-1480. PMC2375695
- Shankar G. M, Bloodgood B. L., Townsend M., Walsh D. M., Dennis J. Selkoe D. J., Sabatini B. L. (2007). Natural oligomers of the Alzheimer amyloid-beta protein induce reversible synapse loss by modulation of an NMDAR dependent signaling pathway. J. Neurosci. 27:2866-2875.
- Bloodgood, B.L., Sabatini B.L. (2007). Ca2+ signaling in dendritic spines. Curr.t Opin. Neurobiol. 17: 345–351. PMID 17451936
- Bloodgood B.L., Sabatini B.L. (2007). Nonlinear regulation of unitary synaptic signals by CaV2.3 voltage-sensitive calcium channels located in dendritic spines. Neuron 53: 249–260.
- Bloodgood B.L., Sabatini B.L. (2005). Neuronal activity regulates diffusion across the neck of dendritic spines. Science 310:866-869.
- Ngo-Anh T.J., Bloodgood B.L., Lin M., Sabatini B.L., Maylie J., and Adelman J.P. (2005). SK channels and NMDA receptors form a Ca2+-mediated feedback loop in dendritic spines. Nat. Neurosci. 8:642-649.
