= Naphthoflavone =

Naphthoflavone may refer to:

- α-Naphthoflavone (7,8-benzoflavone)
- β-Naphthoflavone (5,6-benzoflavone)
