= Neuronal PAS domain protein 4 =

Protein-coding gene in the species Homo sapiens

NPAS4

Identifiers
- Aliases: NPAS4, Le-PAS, NXF, PASD10, bHLHe79, neuronal PAS domain protein 4
- External IDs: OMIM: 608554; MGI: 2664186; GeneCards: NPAS4

Gene location (Human)
Chr.	Chromosome 11 (human)
Band	11q13.2	Start	66,421,004 bp
Band	11q13.2	End	66,426,707 bp

Gene location (Mouse)
Chr.	Chromosome 19 (mouse)
Band	19|19 A	Start	5,034,383 bp
Band	19|19 A	End	5,040,344 bp
RNA expression pattern
Bgee	Human / Mouse (ortholog); Top expressed in: pituitary gland; anterior pituitary; gonad; left uterine tube; body of uterus; muscle layer of sigmoid colon; gastric mucosa; smooth muscle tissue; popliteal artery; tibial arteries / Top expressed in: islet of Langerhans; female urethra; superior frontal gyrus; primary visual cortex; prefrontal cortex; nucleus accumbens; olfactory bulb; dentate gyrus of hippocampal formation granule cell; neural layer of retina; cerebellar cortex; More reference expression data
BioGPS	n/a
Gene ontology
Molecular function	DNA binding; DNA-binding transcription activator activity, RNA polymerase II-specific; protein dimerization activity; RNA polymerase II cis-regulatory region sequence-specific DNA binding; protein binding; protein heterodimerization activity; DNA-binding transcription factor activity, RNA polymerase II-specific
Cellular component	postsynapse; transcription regulator complex; nucleus
Biological process	positive regulation of transcription, DNA-templated; regulation of transcription, DNA-templated; cellular response to corticosterone stimulus; positive regulation of transcription by RNA polymerase II; transcription, DNA-templated; transcription by RNA polymerase II; nervous system development; learning; short-term memory; long-term memory; cell differentiation; regulation of synaptic transmission, GABAergic; social behavior; regulation of synaptic plasticity; excitatory postsynaptic potential; inhibitory postsynaptic potential; inhibitory synapse assembly; regulation of transcription by RNA polymerase II
Sources:Amigo / QuickGO
Orthologs
Databases	NCBI: entry; OMA: entry
Species	Human	Mouse
Entrez	266743	225872
Ensembl	ENSG00000174576	ENSMUSG00000045903
UniProt	Q8IUM7	Q8BGD7
RefSeq (mRNA)	NM_178864; NM_001318804	NM_153553
RefSeq (protein)	NP_001305733; NP_849195	NP_705781
Location (UCSC)	Chr 11: 66.42 – 66.43 Mb	Chr 19: 5.03 – 5.04 Mb
PubMed search
- Wikidata
View/Edit Human	View/Edit Mouse

Neuronal PAS domain protein 4 is a protein that in humans is encoded by the NPAS4 gene. The NPAS4 gene is a neuronal activity-dependent immediate early gene that has been identified as a transcription factor. The protein regulates the transcription of genes that control inhibitory synapse development, synaptic plasticity and most recently reported also behavior.

== Function ==
NPAS4 is a member of the basic helix-loop-helix-PER-ARNT-SIM (bHLH-PAS) class of transcriptional regulators, which are involved in a wide range of physiologic and developmental events (Ooe et al., 2004 [PubMed 14701734]).[supplied by OMIM, Mar 2008].

NPAS4 has been shown to play critical roles in regulating the plasticity of inhibitory neurons. It was found that NPAS4 helps to regulate plasticity by orchestrating a redistribution of inhibitory synapses, wherein they are lost from proximal apical dendrites of CA1 pyramidal neurons and increased on the somata.
