= Aryl hydrocarbon receptor =

Vertebrate receptor protein and transcription factor

AHR
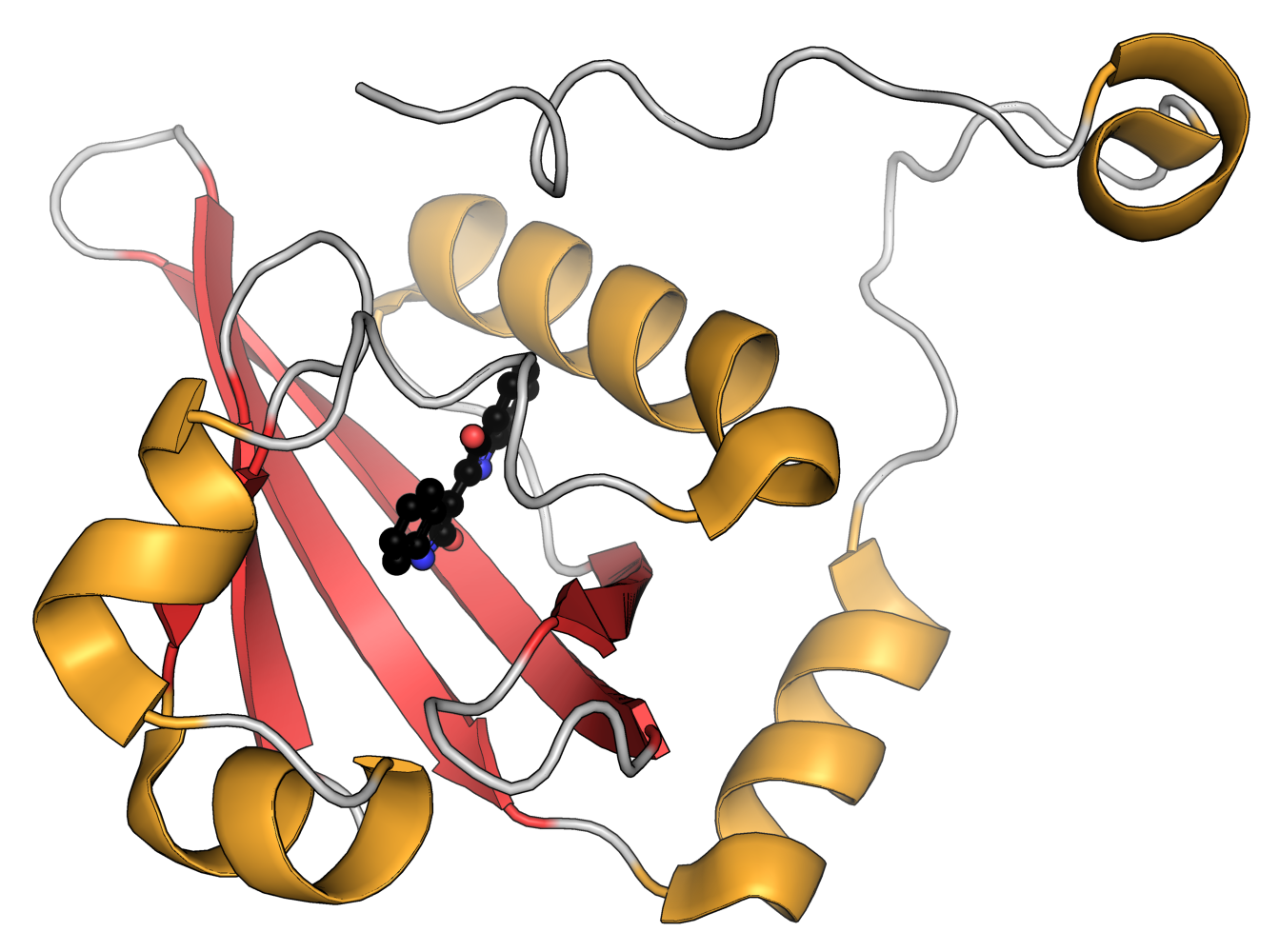

Identifiers
- Aliases: AHR, bHLHe76, aryl hydrocarbon receptor, Aryl hydrocarbon receptor, RP85
- External IDs: OMIM: 600253; MGI: 105043; GeneCards: AHR

Gene location (Human)
Chr.	Chromosome 7 (human)
Band	7p21.1	Start	16,916,359 bp
Band	7p21.1	End	17,346,152 bp

Gene location (Mouse)
Chr.	Chromosome 12 (mouse)
Band	12 A3|12 15.78 cM	Start	35,547,973 bp
Band	12 A3|12 15.78 cM	End	35,585,037 bp
RNA expression pattern
Bgee	Human / Mouse (ortholog); Top expressed in: visceral pleura; parietal pleura; superficial temporal artery; mucosa of paranasal sinus; Achilles tendon; lower lobe of lung; gallbladder; skin of hip; vulva; tibial nerve / Top expressed in: left lung lobe; urothelium; mucosa of urinary bladder; transitional epithelium of urinary bladder; carotid body; sciatic nerve; skin of external ear; right lung; vestibular sensory epithelium; conjunctival fornix; More reference expression data
BioGPS	n/a
Gene ontology
Molecular function	DNA binding; Hsp90 protein binding; protein dimerization activity; transcription factor binding; nuclear receptor activity; E-box binding; protein binding; protein heterodimerization activity; DNA-binding transcription factor activity; TFIID-class transcription factor complex binding; transcription coactivator binding; TBP-class protein binding; DNA-binding transcription factor activity, RNA polymerase II-specific; protein homodimerization activity; sequence-specific double-stranded DNA binding
Cellular component	cytoplasm; transcription regulator complex; cytosolic aryl hydrocarbon receptor complex; nuclear aryl hydrocarbon receptor complex; nucleus; aryl hydrocarbon receptor complex; cytosol; nucleoplasm; protein-containing complex
Biological process	regulation of transcription, DNA-templated; rhythmic process; regulation of transcription by RNA polymerase II; transcription by RNA polymerase II; circadian regulation of gene expression; transcription, DNA-templated; positive regulation of transcription, DNA-templated; regulation of B cell proliferation; blood vessel development; regulation of gene expression; xenobiotic metabolic process; cell cycle; negative regulation of transcription, DNA-templated; response to toxic substance; positive regulation of transcription by RNA polymerase II; apoptotic process; intracellular receptor signaling pathway; response to drug; cAMP-mediated signaling; cellular response to cAMP; cellular response to forskolin; cellular response to 2,3,7,8-tetrachlorodibenzodioxine
Sources:Amigo / QuickGO
Orthologs
Databases	NCBI: entry; OMA: entry
Species	Human	Mouse
Entrez	196	11622
Ensembl	ENSG00000106546	ENSMUSG00000019256
UniProt	P35869	P30561
RefSeq (mRNA)	NM_001621	NM_013464; NM_001314027
RefSeq (protein)	NP_001612	NP_001300956; NP_038492
Location (UCSC)	Chr 7: 16.92 – 17.35 Mb	Chr 12: 35.55 – 35.59 Mb
PubMed search
- Wikidata
View/Edit Human	View/Edit Mouse

The aryl hydrocarbon receptor (also known as AhR, AHR, ahr, ahR, AH receptor, or as the dioxin receptor) is a protein that in humans is encoded by the AHR gene. The aryl hydrocarbon receptor is a transcription factor that regulates gene expression. It was originally thought to function primarily as a sensor of xenobiotic chemicals and also as the regulator of enzymes such as cytochrome P450s that metabolize these chemicals. The most notable of these xenobiotic chemicals are aromatic (aryl) hydrocarbons from which the receptor derives its name.

More recently, it has been discovered that AhR is activated (or deactivated) by a number of endogenous indole derivatives such as kynurenine. In addition to regulating metabolism enzymes, the AhR has roles in regulating immune cells, stem cell maintenance, and cellular differentiation.

The aryl hydrocarbon receptor is a member of the family of basic helix-loop-helix transcription factors. AhR binds several exogenous ligands such as natural plant flavonoids, polyphenols and indoles, as well as synthetic polycyclic aromatic hydrocarbons and dioxin-like compounds. AhR is a cytosolic transcription factor that is normally inactive, bound to several co-chaperones. Upon ligand binding to chemicals such as 2,3,7,8-tetrachlorodibenzo-p-dioxin (TCDD), the chaperones dissociate resulting in AhR translocating into the nucleus and dimerizing with ARNT (AhR nuclear translocator), leading to changes in gene transcription.

== Protein functional domains ==
AhR Functional Domains

The AhR protein contains several domains critical for function and is classified as a member of the basic helix-loop-helix/Per-Arnt-Sim (bHLH/PAS) family of transcription factors. The bHLH motif is located in the N-terminal of the protein and is a common entity in a variety of transcription factors. Members of the bHLH superfamily have two functionally distinctive and highly conserved domains. The first is the basic-region (b), which is involved in the binding of the transcription factor to DNA. The second is the helix-loop-helix (HLH) region, which facilitates protein-protein interactions. Also contained with the AhR are two PAS domains, PAS-A and PAS-B, which are stretches of 200–350 amino acids that exhibit a high sequence homology to the protein domains that were originally found in the Drosophila genes period (Per) and single-minded (Sim) and in AhR's dimerization partner the aryl hydrocarbon receptor nuclear translocator (ARNT). The PAS domains support specific secondary interactions with other PAS domain containing proteins, as is the case with AhR and ARNT, so that dimeric and heteromeric protein complexes can form. The ligand binding site of AhR is contained within the PAS-B domain and contains several conserved residues critical for ligand binding. Finally, a glutamine-rich (Q-rich) domain is located in the C-terminal region of the protein and is involved in co-activator recruitment and transactivation.

== Ligands ==
AhR ligands have been generally classified into two categories, synthetic or naturally occurring. The first ligands to be discovered were synthetic aromatic hydrocarbons such as the polychlorinated dibenzodioxins, dibenzofurans, biphenyls and the non-chlorinated naphthoflavones alongside the naturally occurring polycyclic aromatic hydrocarbons (3-methylcholanthrene, benzo[a]pyrene and benzanthracene). A range of synthetic ligands have been designed as potential breast cancer treatments.

Research has focused on other naturally occurring compounds with the hope of identifying an endogenous ligand. Naturally occurring compounds that have been identified as ligands of Ahr include derivatives of tryptophan such as indigo dye and indirubin, tetrapyrroles such as bilirubin, the arachidonic acid metabolites lipoxin A4 and prostaglandin G, modified low-density lipoprotein and several dietary carotenoids. One assumption made in the search for an endogenous ligand is that the ligand will be a receptor agonist. However, work by Savouret et al. has shown this may not be the case since their findings demonstrate that 7-ketocholesterol competitively inhibits Ahr signal transduction.

Carbidopa is a selective aryl hydrocarbon receptor modulator (SAhRM). Other SAhRMs include microbial-derived 1,4-dihydroxy-2-naphthoic acid and plant-derived 3,3'-diindolylmethane.

Indolocarbazole (ICZ) is one of the strongest non-halogenated agonists for AhR in vitro reported.

Ligand-independent AhR activity can be seen in mammalian AhR. The mammalian AhR needs no exogenous ligand-dependent activation to be functional, and this appears to be the case for its role in the regulation of the expression of some transforming growth factor-beta (TGF-b) isoforms. This is not to say that ligand-dependent AhR activation is not needed for the AhR to function in those cases, but that, if a ligand is needed, it is provided endogenously by the cells or tissues in question and its identity is unknown.

== Signaling pathway ==
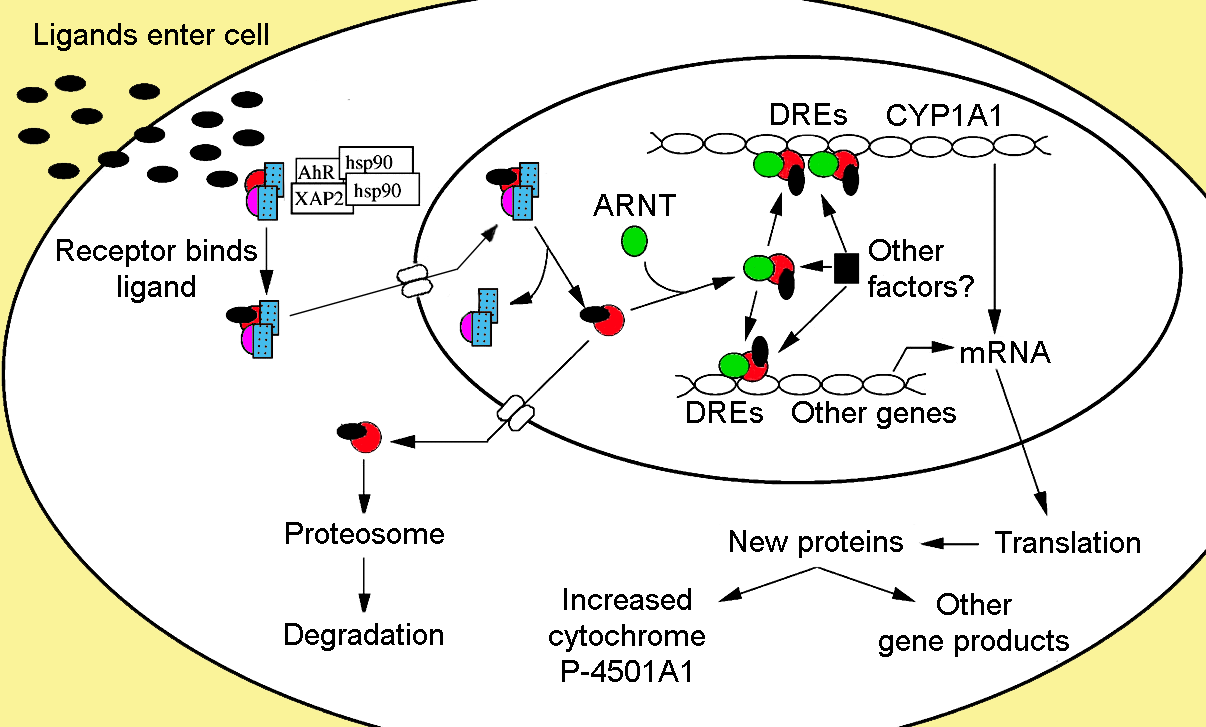
AhR Signaling Pathway

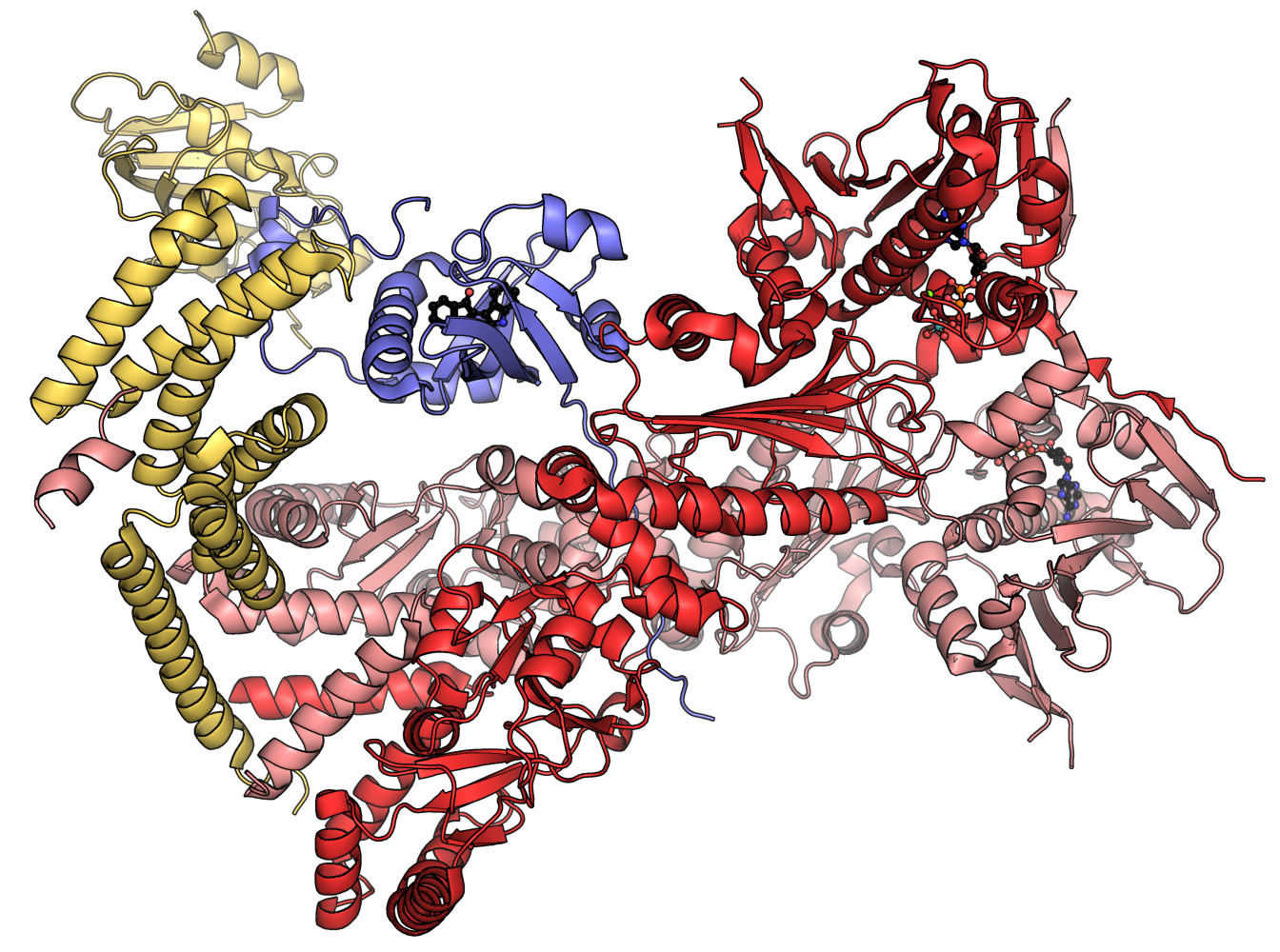
Complex of the aryl hydrocarbon receptor (AhR, blue), AhR-interacting protein (XAP2, yellow) and heat shock protein 90-beta (Hsp90, red). AhR and Hsp90 are bound to indirubin and ADP, respectively.

=== Cytosolic complex ===
Non-ligand bound AhR is retained in the cytoplasm as an inactive protein complex consisting of a dimer of Hsp90, prostaglandin E synthase 3 (PTGES3, p23) and a single molecule of the immunophilin-like AH receptor-interacting protein, also known as hepatitis B virus X-associated protein 2 (XAP2), AhR interacting protein (AIP), and AhR-activated 9 (ARA9). The dimer of Hsp90, along with PTGES3 (p23), has a multifunctional role in the protection of the receptor from proteolysis, constraining the receptor in a conformation receptive to ligand binding and preventing the premature binding of ARNT. AIP interacts with carboxyl-terminal of Hsp90 and binds to the AhR nuclear localization sequence (NLS) preventing the inappropriate trafficking of the receptor into the nucleus.

=== Transforming growth factor-beta (TGF-β) signaling pathway ===
TGF-β cytokines are members of a signaling protein family that includes activin, Nodal subfamily, bone morphogenetic proteins, growth and differentiation factors, and Müllerian inhibitor subfamily. TGF-β signaling plays an important role in cell physiology and development by inhibiting cell proliferation, promoting apoptosis, inducing differentiation, and determining developmental fate in vertebrates and invertebrates. TGF-β activators include proteases such as plasmin, cathepsins, and calpains. Thrombospondin 1, a glycoprotein that inhibits angiogenesis, and matrix metalloproteinase 2 (MMP-2). The extracellular matrix itself appears to play an important regulatory role in TGF-β signaling.

=== Receptor activation ===
Upon ligand binding to AhR, AIP is released resulting in exposure of the NLS, which is located in the bHLH region, leading to import into the nucleus. It is presumed that once in the nucleus, Hsp90 dissociates exposing the two PAS domains allowing the binding of ARNT. The activated AhR/ARNT heterodimer complex is then capable of either directly or indirectly interacting with DNA by binding to recognition sequences located in the 5’- regulatory region of dioxin-responsive genes.

=== DNA binding (xenobiotic response element – XRE) ===
The classical recognition motif of the AhR/ARNT complex, referred to as either the AhR-, dioxin- or xenobiotic- responsive element (AHRE, DRE or XRE), contains the core sequence 5'-GCGTG-3' within the consensus sequence 5'-T/GNGCGTGA/CG/CA-3' in the promoter region of AhR responsive genes. The AhR/ARNT heterodimer directly binds the AHRE/DRE/XRE core sequence in an asymmetric manner such that ARNT binds to 5'-GTG-3' and AhR binding 5'-TC/TGC-3'. Recent research suggests that a second type of element termed AHRE-II, 5'-CATG(N6)C[T/A]TG-3', is capable of indirectly acting with the AhR/ARNT complex. Regardless of the response element, the result is a variety of differential changes in gene expression.

== Functional role in physiology and toxicology ==
=== Role in development ===
In terms of evolution, the oldest physiological role of AhR is in development. AhR is presumed to have evolved from invertebrates where it served a ligand-independent role in normal development processes. The AhR homolog in Drosophila, spineless (ss) is necessary for development of the distal segments of the antenna and leg. Ss dimerizes with tango (tgo), which is the homolog to the mammalian Arnt, to initiate gene transcription. Evolution of the receptor in vertebrates resulted in the ability to bind ligands and might have helped humans evolve to tolerate smoky fires. In developing vertebrates, AhR seemingly plays a role in cellular proliferation and differentiation. Despite lacking a clear endogenous ligand, AhR appears to play a role in the differentiation of many developmental pathways, including hematopoiesis, lymphoid systems, T-cells, neurons, and hepatocytes. AhR has also been found to have an important function in hematopoietic stem cells: AhR antagonism promotes their self-renewal and ex-vivo expansion and is involved in megakaryocyte differentiation. In adulthood, signaling is associated with the stress response and mutations in AhR are associated with major depressive disorder.

=== Adaptive and innate response ===
The adaptive response is manifested as the induction of xenobiotic metabolizing enzymes. Evidence of this response was first observed from the induction of cytochrome P450, family 1, subfamily A, polypeptide 1 (Cyp1a1) resultant from TCDD exposure, which was determined to be directly related to activation of the AhR signaling pathway. The search for other metabolizing genes induced by AhR ligands, due to the presence of DREs, has led to the identification of an "AhR gene battery" of Phase I and Phase II metabolizing enzymes consisting of CYP1A1, CYP1A2, CYP1B1, NQO1, ALDH3A1, UGT1A2 and GSTA1. Presumably, vertebrates have this function to be able to detect a wide range of chemicals, indicated by the wide range of substrates AhR is able to bind and facilitate their biotransformation and elimination. The AhR may also signal the presence of toxic chemicals in food and cause aversion of such foods.

AhR activation seems to be also important for immunological responses and inhibiting inflammation through upregulation of interleukin 22 and downregulation of Th17 response. The Knockdown of AHR mostly downregulates the expression of innate immunity genes in THP-1 cells.

=== Toxic response ===
Extensions of the adaptive response are the toxic responses elicited by AhR activation. Toxicity results from two different ways of AhR signaling. The first is a side effect of the adaptive response in which the induction of metabolizing enzymes results in the production of toxic metabolites. For example, the polycyclic aromatic hydrocarbon benzo[a]pyrene (BaP), a ligand for AhR, induces its own metabolism and bioactivation to a toxic metabolite via the induction of CYP1A1 and CYP1B1 in several tissues. The second approach to toxicity is the result of aberrant changes in global gene transcription beyond those observed in the "AhR gene battery." These global changes in gene expression lead to adverse changes in cellular processes and function. Microarray analysis has proved most beneficial in understanding and characterizing this response.

Xenobiotic metabolizing enzymes help with the metabolic process by transforming and the excretion of chemicals. The most potent inducer of CYP1A1 is 2,3,7,8-tetrachlorodibenzo-p-dioxin (TCDD). In addition, TCDD induces a broad spectrum of biochemical and toxic effects, such as teratogenesis, immunosuppression and tumor promotion. Most, if not all, of the effects caused by TCDD and other polycyclic aromatic hydrocarbons (PAHs) are known to be mediated by AhR which has a high binding affinity to TCDD.

== Protein-protein interactions ==
In addition to the protein interactions mentioned above, AhR has also been shown to interact with the following:

- AIP
- ARNTL
- CCNT1
- ESR1
- NCOA1
- NEDD8
- NRIP1
- RELA
- RELB
- RP
