= Syndromic obesity =

Obesity occurring as part of a medical syndrome

Syndromic obesity (SO) refers to obesity when it occurs as part of a syndrome, often along with intellectual disability. Often syndromic obesity is mediated by abnormal development of the hypothalamus (see hypothalamic obesity). Known types of syndromic obesity include some types of monogenic obesity and:

- Prader Willi syndrome
- Bardet-Biedl syndrome
- Alstrom syndrome
- 16p11.2 deletion syndrome
