= AH receptor-interacting protein =

Protein found in humans

AIP

Identifiers
- Aliases: AIP, ARA9, FKBP16, FKBP37, SMTPHN, XAP-2, XAP2, aryl hydrocarbon receptor interacting protein, PITA1
- External IDs: OMIM: 605555; MGI: 109622; GeneCards: AIP
Available structures
PDB	Ortholog search: PDBe RCSB
PDB	List of PDB id codes 2LKN, 4AIF, 4APO

Gene location (Human)
Chr.	Chromosome 11 (human)
Band	11q13.2	Start	67,468,174 bp
Band	11q13.2	End	67,491,154 bp

Gene location (Mouse)
Chr.	Chromosome 19 (mouse)
Band	19 A|19 3.82 cM	Start	4,164,446 bp
Band	19 A|19 3.82 cM	End	4,175,858 bp
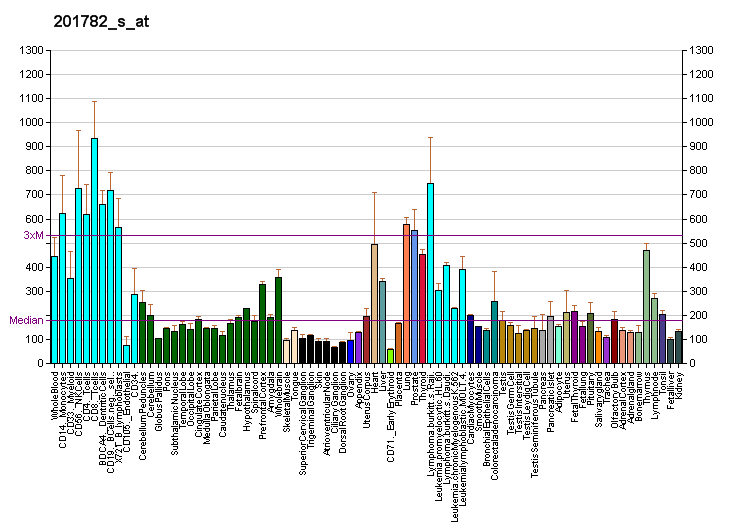

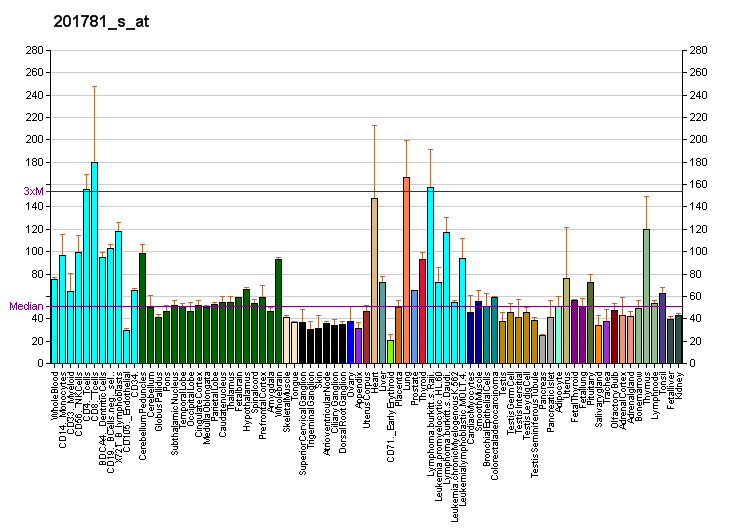
RNA expression pattern
Bgee	Human / Mouse (ortholog); Top expressed in: granulocyte; popliteal artery; tibial arteries; Descending thoracic aorta; right coronary artery; ascending aorta; left coronary artery; canal of the cervix; body of uterus; muscle layer of sigmoid colon / Top expressed in: neural layer of retina; dentate gyrus of hippocampal formation granule cell; granulocyte; quadriceps femoris muscle; yolk sac; muscle tissue; skeletal muscle tissue; cerebellum; hypothalamus; olfactory bulb; More reference expression data
BioGPS	More reference expression data
Gene ontology
Molecular function	protein binding; signal transducer activity; transcription coregulator activity; unfolded protein binding; transcription factor binding; GAF domain binding; transcription coactivator activity; aryl hydrocarbon receptor binding; peptidyl-prolyl cis-trans isomerase activity
Cellular component	aryl hydrocarbon receptor complex; membrane; plasma membrane; cytosol; nucleoplasm; cytoplasm
Biological process	protein targeting to mitochondrion; negative regulation of cyclic-nucleotide phosphodiesterase activity; regulation of protein kinase A signaling; protein maturation by protein folding; xenobiotic metabolic process; interleukin-12-mediated signaling pathway; regulation of nucleic acid-templated transcription; positive regulation of nucleic acid-templated transcription; protein peptidyl-prolyl isomerization
Sources:Amigo / QuickGO
Orthologs
Databases	NCBI: entry; OMA: entry
Species	Human	Mouse
Entrez	9049	11632
Ensembl	ENSG00000110711	ENSMUSG00000024847
UniProt	O00170	O08915
RefSeq (mRNA)	NM_003977; NM_001302959; NM_001302960	NM_001276284; NM_016666
RefSeq (protein)	NP_001289888; NP_001289889; NP_003968	NP_001263213; NP_057875
Location (UCSC)	Chr 11: 67.47 – 67.49 Mb	Chr 19: 4.16 – 4.18 Mb
PubMed search
- Wikidata
View/Edit Human	View/Edit Mouse

AH receptor-interacting protein (AIP) also known as aryl hydrocarbon receptor-interacting protein, immunophilin homolog ARA9, or HBV X-associated protein 2 (XAP-2) is a protein that in humans is encoded by the AIP gene. The protein is a member of the FKBP family.

== Function ==
AIP may play a positive role in aryl hydrocarbon receptor-mediated signalling possibly by influencing its receptivity for ligand and/or its nuclear targeting. AIP is the cellular negative regulator of the hepatitis B virus (HBV) X protein. Further, it's been known to suppress antiviral signaling and the induction of type I interferon by targeting IRF7, a key player in the antiviral signal pathways. AIP consists of an N-terminal FKBP52 like domain and a C-terminal TPR domain.

== Mutations and role in disease ==
AIP mutations may be the cause of a familial form of acromegaly, familial isolated pituitary adenoma (FIPA). Somatotropinomas (i.e. GH-producing pituitary adenomas), sometimes associated with prolactinomas, are present in most AIP mutated patients.

== Interactions ==
AIP has been shown to interact with the aryl hydrocarbon receptor, peroxisome proliferator-activated receptor alpha and the aryl hydrocarbon receptor nuclear translocator. Further, it has shown that AIP can interact with IRF7 to exert its novel function of negatively regulating antiviral signal pathways.
