= Β-Naphthoflavone =

β-Naphthoflavone

Names
- IUPAC name Benzo[5,6]flavone
- Systematic IUPAC name 3-Phenyl-1H-naphtho[2,1-b]pyran-1-one
- Other names 5,6-Benzoflavone, BNF

Identifiers
CAS Number	6051-87-2
3D model (JSmol)	Interactive image
ChEBI	CHEBI:77013
ChEMBL	ChEMBL26260
ChemSpider	2271
DrugBank	DB06732
ECHA InfoCard	100.025.417
PubChem CID	2361
UNII	1BT0256Y8O
CompTox Dashboard (EPA)	DTXSID8030423
- InChI: InChI=1S/C19H12O2/c20-16-12-18(14-7-2-1-3-8-14)21-17-11-10-13-6-4-5-9-15(13)19(16)17/h1-12H Key: OUGIDAPQYNCXRA-UHFFFAOYSA-N; InChI=1/C19H12O2/c20-16-12-18(14-7-2-1-3-8-14)21-17-11-10-13-6-4-5-9-15(13)19(16)17/h1-12H Key: OUGIDAPQYNCXRA-UHFFFAOYAM
- SMILES: O=C\1c3c(O/C(=C/1)c2ccccc2)ccc4c3cccc4

Properties
Chemical formula	C_{19}H_{12}O_{2}
Molar mass	272.303 g·mol^{−1}
- Except where otherwise noted, data are given for materials in their standard state (at 25 °C [77 °F], 100 kPa). verify (what is ?) Infobox references

β-Naphthoflavone, also known as 5,6-benzoflavone, is a potent agonist of the aryl hydrocarbon receptor and as such is an inducer of such detoxification enzymes as cytochromes P450 (CYPs) and uridine 5'-diphospho-glucuronosyltransferases (UGTs). β-Naphthoflavone is a putative chemopreventive agent.

== See also ==
- α-Naphthoflavone
