= Aryl hydrocarbon receptor nuclear translocator =

Protein found in humans

ARNT
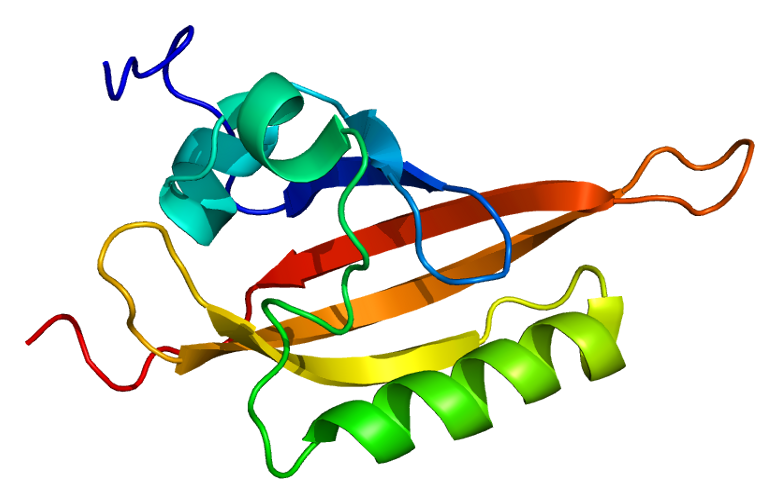

Identifiers
- Aliases: ARNT, HIF-1-beta, HIF-1beta, HIF1-beta, HIF1B, HIF1BETA, TANGO, bHLHe2, aryl hydrocarbon receptor nuclear translocator, Aryl hydrocarbon receptor nuclear translocator
- External IDs: OMIM: 126110; MGI: 88071; GeneCards: ARNT
Available structures
PDB	Ortholog search: PDBe RCSB
PDB	List of PDB id codes 4PKY, 1X0O, 2A24, 2B02, 2HV1, 2K7S, 3F1N, 3F1O, 3F1P, 3H7W, 3H82, 4EQ1, 4GHI, 4GS9, 4H6J, 4LPZ, 4XT2

Gene location (Human)
Chr.	Chromosome 1 (human)
Band	1q21.3	Start	150,809,713 bp
Band	1q21.3	End	150,876,708 bp

Gene location (Mouse)
Chr.	Chromosome 3 (mouse)
Band	3 F2.1|3 40.74 cM	Start	95,341,699 bp
Band	3 F2.1|3 40.74 cM	End	95,404,551 bp
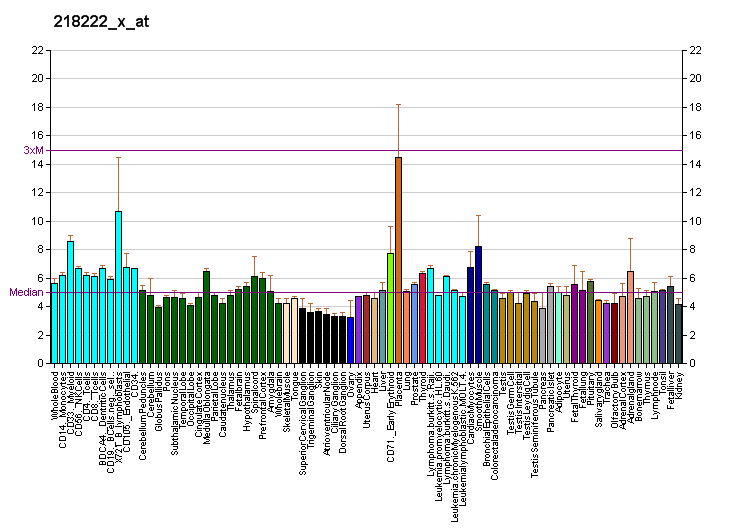

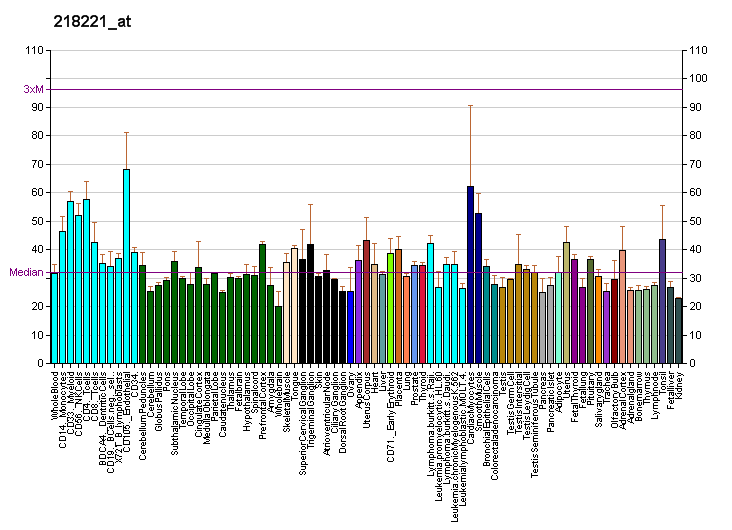

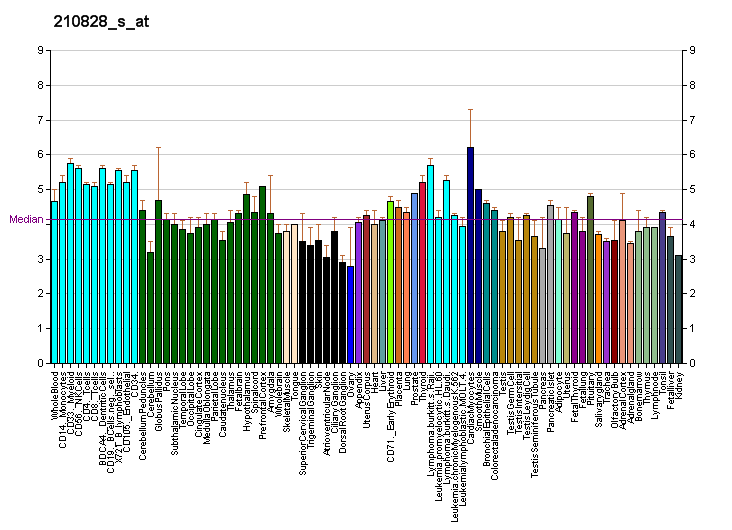
RNA expression pattern
Bgee	Human / Mouse (ortholog); Top expressed in: epithelium of colon; Achilles tendon; sural nerve; canal of the cervix; left ovary; right ovary; gastric mucosa; stromal cell of endometrium; ectocervix; body of uterus / Top expressed in: ascending aorta; aortic valve; parotid gland; muscle of thigh; tongue; cumulus cell; molar; atrium; pineal gland; external carotid artery; More reference expression data
BioGPS	More reference expression data
Gene ontology
Molecular function	sequence-specific DNA binding; DNA binding; protein dimerization activity; DNA-binding transcription factor activity; transcription coactivator activity; aryl hydrocarbon receptor binding; transcription factor binding; protein binding; protein heterodimerization activity; transcription factor activity, RNA polymerase II distal enhancer sequence-specific binding; DNA-binding transcription factor activity, RNA polymerase II-specific; protein homodimerization activity; sequence-specific double-stranded DNA binding; nuclear receptor activity
Cellular component	cytoplasm; transcription regulator complex; nucleoplasm; RNA polymerase II transcription regulator complex; nucleus; nuclear body
Biological process	positive regulation of vascular endothelial growth factor receptor signaling pathway; cell differentiation; response to hypoxia; regulation of transcription, DNA-templated; positive regulation of endothelial cell proliferation; regulation of transcription from RNA polymerase II promoter in response to oxidative stress; positive regulation of erythrocyte differentiation; embryonic placenta development; mRNA transcription by RNA polymerase II; positive regulation of protein sumoylation; transcription, DNA-templated; positive regulation of transcription, DNA-templated; intracellular receptor signaling pathway; regulation of transcription from RNA polymerase II promoter in response to hypoxia; positive regulation of vascular endothelial growth factor production; positive regulation of glycolytic process; positive regulation of transcription by RNA polymerase II; positive regulation of hormone biosynthetic process; xenobiotic metabolic process
Sources:Amigo / QuickGO
Orthologs
Databases	NCBI: entry; OMA: entry
Species	Human	Mouse
Entrez	405	11863
Ensembl	ENSG00000143437	ENSMUSG00000015522
UniProt	P27540	P53762
RefSeq (mRNA)	NM_001197325; NM_001286035; NM_001286036; NM_001668; NM_178426 NM_178427; NM_001350224; NM_001350225; NM_001350226	NM_001037737; NM_009709
RefSeq (protein)	NP_001184254; NP_001272964; NP_001272965; NP_001659; NP_848514 NP_001337153; NP_001337154; NP_001337155	NP_001032826; NP_033839
Location (UCSC)	Chr 1: 150.81 – 150.88 Mb	Chr 3: 95.34 – 95.4 Mb
PubMed search
- Wikidata
View/Edit Human	View/Edit Mouse

The ARNT gene encodes the aryl hydrocarbon receptor nuclear translocator protein that forms a complex with ligand-bound aryl hydrocarbon receptor (AhR), and is required for receptor function. The encoded protein has also been identified as the beta subunit of a heterodimeric transcription factor, hypoxia-inducible factor 1 (HIF1). A t(1;12)(q21;p13) translocation, which results in a TEL–ARNT fusion protein, is associated with acute myeloblastic leukemia. Three alternatively spliced variants encoding different isoforms have been described for this gene.

The aryl hydrocarbon receptor (AhR) is involved in the induction of several enzymes that participate in xenobiotic metabolism. The ligand-free, cytosolic form of the aryl hydrocarbon receptor is complexed to heat shock protein 90. Binding of ligand, which includes dioxin and polycyclic aromatic hydrocarbons, results in translocation of the ligand-binding subunit only into the nucleus. Induction of enzymes involved in xenobiotic metabolism occurs through binding of the ligand-bound AhR to xenobiotic responsive elements in the promoters of genes for these enzymes.

== Interactions ==
Aryl hydrocarbon receptor nuclear translocator has been shown to interact with:

- AIP,
- AHR,
- EPAS1,
- HIF1A,
- NCOA2,
- SIM1, and
- SIM2.
