= Α-Naphthoflavone =

α-Naphthoflavone
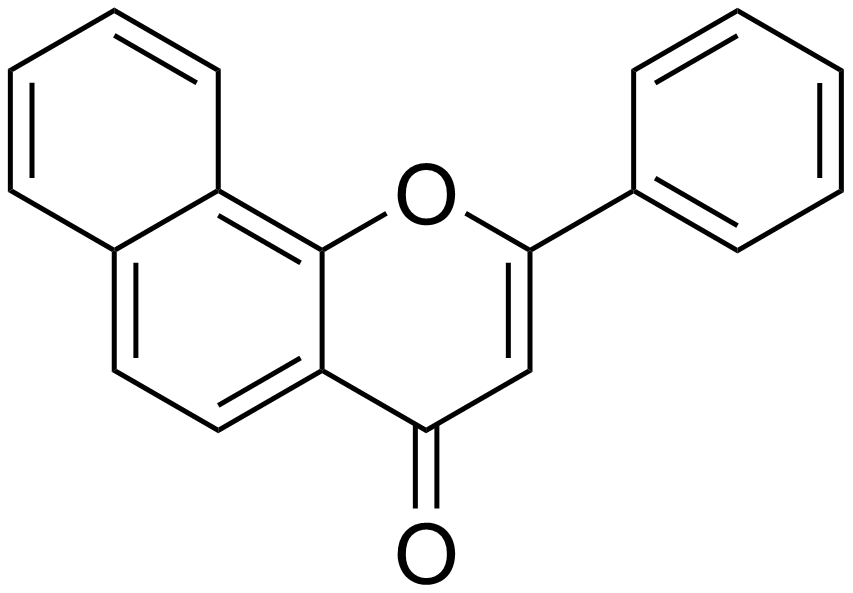

Names
- IUPAC name Benzo[7,8]flavone
- Systematic IUPAC name 2-Phenyl-4H-naphtho[1,2-b]pyran-4-one
- Other names 7,8-Benzoflavone; ANF; 2-Phenyl-benzo[h]chromen-4-one

Identifiers
| CAS Number | 604-59-1 |
| 3D model (JSmol) | Interactive image |
| ChEBI | CHEBI:76995 |
| ChEMBL | ChEMBL283196 |
| ChemSpider | 11297 |
| DrugBank | DB07453 |
| ECHA InfoCard | 100.009.156 |
| EC Number | 210-071-1 |
| PubChem CID | 11790 |
| UNII | FML65D8PY5 |
| CompTox Dashboard (EPA) | DTXSID2040650 |
- InChI: InChI=1S/C19H12O2/c20-17-12-18(14-7-2-1-3-8-14)21-19-15-9-5-4-6-13(15)10-11-16(17)19/h1-12H Key: VFMMPHCGEFXGIP-UHFFFAOYSA-N; InChI=1/C19H12O2/c20-17-12-18(14-7-2-1-3-8-14)21-19-15-9-5-4-6-13(15)10-11-16(17)19/h1-12H Key: VFMMPHCGEFXGIP-UHFFFAOYAW
- SMILES: O=C\1c4c(O/C(=C/1)c2ccccc2)c3ccccc3cc4

Properties
| Chemical formula | C_{19}H_{12}O_{2} |
| Molar mass | 272.303 g·mol^{−1} |
- Except where otherwise noted, data are given for materials in their standard state (at 25 °C [77 °F], 100 kPa). verify (what is ?) Infobox references

α-Naphthoflavone, also known as 7,8-benzoflavone and 2-phenyl-benzo[h]chromen-4-one, is a synthetic flavone derivative. It can be prepared from 2-naphthol and cinnamaldehyde.

α-Naphthoflavone is a potent inhibitor of the enzyme aromatase, the enzyme that converts testosterone to estrogen. α-Naphthoflavone has been shown to cause abnormal testicular development in young chickens.

== See also ==
- β-Naphthoflavone
- C_{19}H_{12}O_{2}
