= SIM1 =

Genetic protein

Identifiers
- Aliases: SIM1, bHLHe14, single-minded family bHLH transcription factor 1, SIM bHLH transcription factor 1
- External IDs: OMIM: 603128; MGI: 98306; GeneCards: SIM1

Gene location (Human)
| Chr. | Chromosome 6 (human) |
| Band | 6q16.3 | Start | 100,385,009 bp |
| Band | 6q16.3 | End | 100,464,921 bp |

Gene location (Mouse)
| Chr. | Chromosome 10 (mouse) |
| Band | 10 B3|10 24.87 cM | Start | 50,770,850 bp |
| Band | 10 B3|10 24.87 cM | End | 50,865,248 bp |
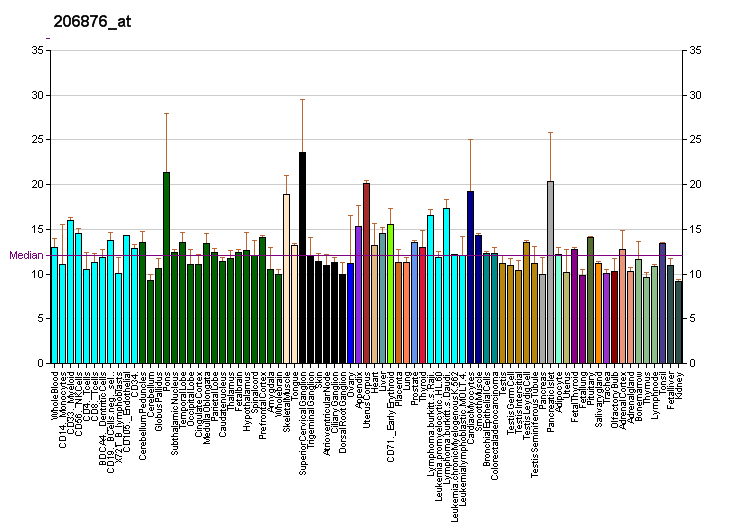
RNA expression pattern
| Bgee | Human / Mouse (ortholog); Top expressed in: renal medulla; Skeletal muscle tissue of biceps brachii; human penis; Skeletal muscle tissue of rectus abdominis; corpus epididymis; caput epididymis; testicle; vastus lateralis muscle; islet of Langerhans; kidney tubule / Top expressed in: supraoptic nucleus; inner renal medulla; paraventricular nucleus of hypothalamus; lumbar subsegment of spinal cord; mammillary body; right kidney; dorsomedial hypothalamic nucleus; soleus muscle; outer renal medulla; Bowman's capsule; More reference expression data |
| BioGPS | More reference expression data |
Gene ontology
| Molecular function | DNA-binding transcription factor activity; DNA binding; protein dimerization activity; protein heterodimerization activity; DNA-binding transcription factor activity, RNA polymerase II-specific |
| Cellular component | nucleus |
| Biological process | regulation of transcription by RNA polymerase II; multicellular organism development; cell differentiation; ureteric bud development; regulation of transcription, DNA-templated; transcription, DNA-templated; nervous system development |
Sources:Amigo / QuickGO
Orthologs
| Databases | NCBI: entry; OMA: entry |
| Species | Human | Mouse |
| Entrez | 6492 | 20464 |
| Ensembl | ENSG00000112246 | ENSMUSG00000019913 |
| UniProt | P81133 | Q61045 |
| RefSeq (mRNA) | NM_005068; NM_001374769 | NM_011376 |
| RefSeq (protein) | NP_005059; NP_001361698 | NP_035506 |
| Location (UCSC) | Chr 6: 100.39 – 100.46 Mb | Chr 10: 50.77 – 50.87 Mb |
| PubMed search |
- Wikidata
| View/Edit Human | View/Edit Mouse |

Single-minded homolog 1, also known as class E basic helix-loop-helix protein 14 (bHLHe14), is a protein that in humans is encoded by the SIM1 gene.

== Function ==
The SIM1 and SIM2 genes are homologs of Drosophila melanogaster single-minded (sim), so named because cells in the midline of the sim mutant embryo fail to properly develop and eventually die, and thus the paired longitudinal axon bundles that span the anterior-posterior axis of the embryo (analogous to the embryo's spinal cord) are collapsed into a "single" rudimentary axon bundle at the midline. SIM is a basic helix-loop-helix–PAS domain transcription factor that regulates gene expression in the midline cells. Because the sim gene plays an important role in Drosophila development and has peak levels of expression during the period of neurogenesis, it was proposed that the human SIM2 gene, which resides in a critical region of chromosome 21, is a candidate for involvement in certain dysmorphic features (particularly facial and skull characteristics), abnormalities of brain development, or mental retardation of Down syndrome.

== Clinical significance ==
Haploinsufficiency of SIM1 has been shown to cause severe early-onset obesity in a human girl with a de novo balanced translocation between chromosomes 1p22.1 and 6q16.2 and has been suggested to cause a Prader-Willi-like phenotype in other cases. Additionally, studies in mice have shown that haploinsufficiency of Sim1 causes obesity that is due to hyperphagia and do not respond properly to increased dietary fat. Overexpression of SIM1 protects against diet induced obesity and rescues the hyperphagia of agouti yellow mice, who have disrupted melanocortin signaling. The obesity and hyperphagia may be mediated by impaired melanocortin activation of PVN neurons and oxytocin deficiency in these mice. It has been demonstrated that modulating SIM1 levels postnatally also leads to hyperphagia and obesity, suggesting a physiological role for SIM1 separate from its role in development.

== Interactions ==
SIM1 has been shown to interact with aryl hydrocarbon receptor nuclear translocator.
