= SIM2 =

Protein-coding gene in the species Homo sapiens

Identifiers
- Aliases: SIM2, HMC13F06, HMC29C01, SIM, bHLHe15, single-minded family bHLH transcription factor 2, SIM bHLH transcription factor 2
- External IDs: OMIM: 600892; MGI: 98307; GeneCards: SIM2

Gene location (Human)
Chr.	Chromosome 21 (human)
Band	21q22.13	Start	36,699,115 bp
Band	21q22.13	End	36,749,917 bp
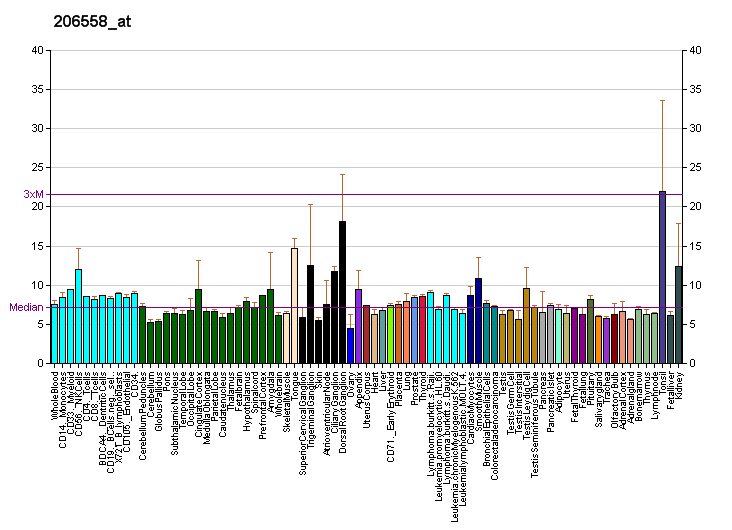
RNA expression pattern
Bgee	Human / Mouse (ortholog); Top expressed in: renal medulla; buccal mucosa cell; oral cavity; amniotic fluid; vastus lateralis muscle; human kidney; superior surface of tongue; tibia; testicle; nipple / Top expressed in: esophagus; trachea; soleus muscle; submandibular gland; triceps brachii muscle; molar; vastus lateralis muscle; knee joint; gastrocnemius muscle; main bronchus; More reference expression data
BioGPS	More reference expression data
Gene ontology
Molecular function	DNA-binding transcription factor activity; protein heterodimerization activity; protein dimerization activity; DNA binding; DNA-binding transcription factor activity, RNA polymerase II-specific
Cellular component	nucleoplasm; nuclear body; nucleus
Biological process	multicellular organism development; regulation of transcription, DNA-templated; negative regulation of transcription by RNA polymerase II; regulation of transcription by RNA polymerase II; cell differentiation; embryonic pattern specification; transcription, DNA-templated; lung development; negative regulation of transcription, DNA-templated; nervous system development
Sources:Amigo / QuickGO
Orthologs
Databases	NCBI: entry; OMA: entry
Species	Human	Mouse
Entrez	6493	20465
Ensembl	ENSG00000159263	ENSMUSG00000062713
UniProt	Q14190	n/a
RefSeq (mRNA)	NM_005069; NM_009586	NM_011377
RefSeq (protein)	NP_005060; NP_033664	n/a
Location (UCSC)	Chr 21: 36.7 – 36.75 Mb	n/a
PubMed search
- Wikidata
View/Edit Human	View/Edit Mouse

Single-minded homolog 2 is a protein that in humans is encoded by the SIM2 gene. It plays a major role in the development of the central nervous system midline as well as the construction of the face and head.

== Function ==
SIM1 and SIM2 genes are Drosophila single-minded (sim) gene homologs. The Drosophila sim gene encodes a transcription factor that is a master regulator of neurogenesis of midline cells in the central nervous system. SIM2 maps within the so-called Down syndrome chromosomal region, specifically on the q arm of chromosome 21, band 22.2. Based on the mapping position, its potential function as transcriptional repressor and similarity to Drosophila sim, it is proposed that SIM2 may contribute to some specific Down syndrome phenotypes

== Interactions ==
SIM2 has been shown to interact with Aryl hydrocarbon receptor nuclear translocator.

When the SIM2 gene is transfected into PC12 cells, it affects the normal cycle of cell maturation. SIM2 inhibits the expression of cyclin E, which in turn inhibits the cell's ability to pass through the G1/S checkpoint and suppresses the cell's proliferation ability. it also up-regulates the presence of p27, a growth inhibitor protein. The presence of p27 inhibits the activation of cell cycle regulatory kinases.

== Disease state ==
There are three states of the gene: +/+, ±, and -/-. When the gene is expressed as SIM2 -/-, it is considered disrupted and many physical malformations are seen, particularly in the craniofacial area. Individuals with SIM2 -/- have either a full or partial secondary palate cleft and malformations in the tongue and pterygoid processes of the sphenoid bone. These malformations cause aerophagia, or the swallowing of air, and postnatal death. Severe aerophagia leads to accumulation of air in the gastrointestinal tract, causing the belly to be distended. It is thought that the over-expression of the SIM2 gene brings about some of the phenotypic deformities that are characteristic of Down syndrome. The presence of SIM2 mRNA in many parts of the brain known to show deformities in individuals with Down syndrome, as well as in the palate, oral and tongue epithelia, mandibular and hyoid bones.

== SIM2 Short (SIM2s) ==
There are two known isoforms of SIM2 which play different roles in various tissues. The isoform SIM2 Short (SIM2s) has been shown to be specifically expressed in mammary gland tissue. SIM2s is a splice variant which lacks exon 11 of SIM2. It has been researched that SIM2s acts in mammary gland development and has tumor suppressive characteristics specifically in breast cancer. In a mouse specimen, when SIM2s was not expressed in mammary epithelial cells there were development defects leading to cancer-like characteristics in the cells. The defects were increased cell proliferation, cellular invasion of local stroma, loss of cellular polarity, and loss of E-cadherin cellular adhesion molecules. These observations suggest that SIM2s is essential for proper mammary gland development. Experiments reintroducing SIM2s in human breast cancer cells allowed for the tumor suppressive characteristics to be observed. Comparing normal human breast cells to human breast cancer cells with immunohistochemical staining showed that SIM2s was expressed more in the normal than the cancerous. Reintroducing SIM2s expression in breast cancer cells showed a decrease in growth, proliferation, and invasiveness. SIM2s represses the actions of the matrix metalloprotease-3 gene (MMP3) which include cell migration, cancer progression, and epithelial to mesenchymal transitions (EMT). SIM2s also represses the SLUG transcription factor which in turn suppresses EMT. EMT suppression allows for E-cadherin to remain and for the cell to not undergo pathological EMT associated with tumor formation. These actions show the tumor suppressive effects of SIM2s in mammary epithelium.

== Knockout model ==
Scientists can purposefully "knockout" or cause the gene to be disrupted. To do this, they perform homologous recombination and eliminate the predicted start codon and the following 47 amino acids. Then the EcoRI restriction site is introduced into the chromosome.
