= Solutia =

American manufacturer of materials and specialty chemicals

- Type: Public
- Industry: Chemical industry
- Founded: September 1, 1997
- Defunct: July 2, 2012
- Fate: Acquired by Eastman Chemical Company
- Headquarters: Town and Country, Missouri
- Area served: Worldwide
- Key people: Jeffry Quinn (chairman, president, and CEO)
- Products: Specialty chemicals
- Number of employees: ~3400
- Website: www.solutia.com

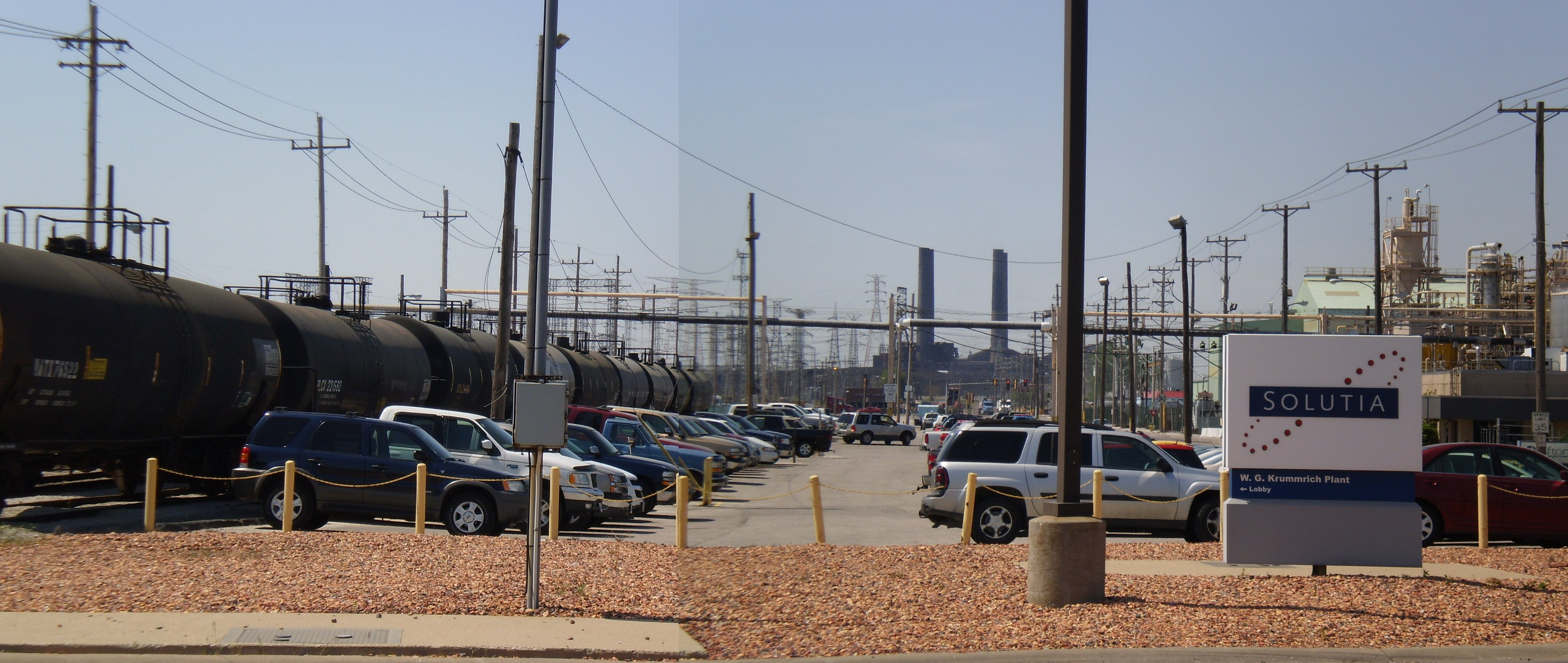
318 Monsanto St., East St Louis, Il.

Solutia Inc. was an American manufacturer of materials and specialty chemicals including polyvinyl butyral (PVB), ethylene vinyl acetate (EVA), and thermoplastic polyurethane (TPU) interlayers for laminated glass, aftermarket window films, protective barrier and conductive films, and rubber processing chemicals. The company was formed on September 1, 1997, as a divestiture of the Monsanto Company chemical business. In July 2012, the company was acquired by Eastman Chemical Company.

Solutia's worldwide headquarters were located in Town and Country, Missouri, United States, with regional headquarters located in Zaventem, Belgium; São Paulo, Brazil; and Shanghai, China.

Solutia was known as the world's leading manufacturer of PVB, EVA, and TPU interlayers, custom-coated window and performance films, and chemicals for the rubber industry. In 2009, the company completed the sale of its nylon division, with closure of the sale in the second quarter 2009. In 2010, the company purchased Etimex-Solar and Novomatrix, further enhancing its portfolio of interlayer and film products.

== History ==
The company was formed on September 1, 1997, as a divestiture of the Monsanto Company chemical business. Solutia filed for bankruptcy on December 17, 2003, in response to significant litigation surrounding various products, unsustainable debt structure, and a downturn in the economy. Solutia emerged from bankruptcy on February 28, 2008.

Solutia employed approximately 3,400 people in more than 50 locations worldwide, and reported $1.67 billion in annual revenues for 2009, and $984 million in revenues through June 30, 2010, for its continued operations (nylon revenue not included in figures; new acquisitions included in figures for 2010 only).

Solutia was bought by Eastman Chemical Company in 2012 for $4.8 billion.

== Businesses and products ==
As of April 26, 2010, Solutia reported its businesses in three segments: Advanced Interlayers, Performance Films, and Technical Specialties. The products within these segments are as follows:

=== Advanced Interlayers ===
Advanced Interlayers plastic interlayers are used for laminated safety glass, primarily in automotive and architectural applications; Advanced Interlayers also produces PVB, EVA and TPU solar module encapsulants for thin-film and building-integrated photovoltaic applications. Advanced Interlayers brands include Saflex, Vistasolar, Vanceva Color Studio and KeepSafe Max.

=== Performance Films ===
Performance Films professional and retail window films are custom-coated and used primarily for automotive and architectural aftermarket tinting, safety and energy efficiency applications under the brand names of LLumar, Vista, EnerLogic, V-KOOL, IQue, Hüper Optik, Sun-X, nanoLux, Gila and FormulaOne High Performance Auto Tint. Performance Films precision coatings products, sold under the Flexvue films brand, are used in protective and conductive films for touch screens and electronic devices, as well as thin-film photovoltaic and concentrating solar power applications.

=== Technical specialties ===
- Flexsys rubber processing and antidegradant chemicals, sold under the Crystex and Santoflex brands, are integral to the manufacturing of tires and other rubber products such as belts, hoses, seals and footwear.
- Therminol heat transfer fluids are used in systems that provide for indirect heating or cooling of industrial and chemicals processes, including concentrating solar power plant applications.
- Skydrol aviation hydraulic fluids and the SkyKleen brand of aviation solvents are supplied across the aviation industry.

== Corporate leadership ==
- Jeffry N. Quinn - chairman, president and chief executive officer
- Paul J. Berra III - senior vice president, general counsel and chief administrative officer
- Robert T. DeBolt - senior vice president, business operations
- James M. Sullivan - executive vice president and chief financial officer
- James R. Voss - executive vice president, global operations
- Nadim Z. Qureshi - vice president, corporate strategy and development
- Timothy J. Wessel - president and general manager, Saflex
- Ray J. Kollar - president and general manager, performance films
- D. Michael Donnelly - president and general manager, technical specialties

== Environmental and health record ==
Solutia and its parent company Monsanto agreed in 2003 to pay $700 million to settle claims by 20,000 Anniston, Alabama residents over PCB contamination. Monsanto documents indicate that the company routinely dumped PCBs in the land and water supply of Anniston and covered up its behavior for more than 40 years. In 2008, PCBs were found outside Anniston High School.

Solutia's Springfield, Massachusetts plant ranks as #4 on the EPA's top five facilities that reported the largest quantity of on- and off-site environmental releases in Massachusetts under the Toxics Release Inventory for 2007.

Solutia's Delaware River Plant is responsible for contaminating the soil and the groundwater with three old hazardous-waste disposal areas, a phenol equalization lagoon, two sludge lagoons, a raw-waste lagoon, a process sewer system, a storm-water drainage ditch, and a closed Resource Conservation and Recovery Act (RCRA) regulated hazardous waste landfill.

The Solutia AES Property Site near the Kanawha River in Nitro, West Virginia, was found by the EPA to have 18 buried, deteriorating drums containing dioxin. EPA determined that a threat to public health or welfare or the environment existed due to the release or threat of release of dioxin at the site.

The Solutia facility in Sauget, Illinois is responsible for emitting PCBs, benzene, chlorobenzene, lead, and mercury. Solutia completed an interim remedy in 2004 to contain, intercept, and collect contaminated groundwater discharging and causing environmental impacts to the Mississippi River.

In 2006, the EPA filed suit against Solutia, Shell Oil, and Mallinckrodt over hazardous materials found at the Great Lakes Container Corp. in St. Louis, Missouri. In 1995, a fire alerted officials to the potential dangers of the 11-acre (45,000 m^{2}) site, and environmental investigations turned up buried drums of hazardous materials, asbestos and high levels of lead and polychlorinated biphenyls. According to the consent decree, 61,650 tons of soil contaminated with PCBs and lead was removed from the site as were more than 800 buried drums.

Solutia's Chocolate Bayou Alvin facility ranked #1 in the EPA's top ten facilities in Texas for total on-site and off-site releases of all chemicals in 2009.

In May 2009, the Texas Commission on Environmental Quality approved a penalty of $117,048 assessed against Solutia for 14 air violations that occurred over a year and a half period.
