= Bioremediation of polychlorinated biphenyls =

Polychorinated biphenyls, or PCBs, are a type of chemical that was widely used in the 1960s and 1970s, and which are a contamination source of soil and water. They are fairly stable and therefore persistent in the environment. Bioremediation of PCBs is the use of microorganisms to degrade PCBs from contaminated sites, relying on multiple microorganisms' co-metabolism. Anaerobic microorganisms dechlorinate PCBs first, and other microorganisms that are capable of doing BH pathway can break down the dechlorinated PCBs to usable intermediates like acyl-CoA or carbon dioxide. If no BH pathway-capable microorganisms are present, dechlorinated PCBs can be mineralized with help of fungi and plants. However, there are multiple limiting factors for this co-metabolism.

== Overview ==
=== PCBs ===
General structure of a PCB

Polychlorinated biphenyls (PCBs) are various biphenyl based artificial products that are widely used as a dielectric fluid, industrial coolant, and lubricants in the 1960s and 1970s. There is no evidence its synthesis occurs naturally. They are classified as persistent organic pollutants. PCBs share the basic chemical structure of biphenyl and one or more of the hydrogen atoms on the aromatic rings are replaced by chlorine atoms.

PCBs is in viscous liquid form at normal temperature and has a poor solubility in water. The aromatic hydrocarbon structure gives PCBs relatively high molecular stability. The chlorine substitution further reinforces its insolubility and chemical stability. Hence, the degradation of PCBs in the natural environment is very slow, which can range from 3 to 37 years depending on the number of chloride substitutions and their positions.

=== Bioremediation ===
Bioremediation is a waste removal method that uses microorganisms to degrade or remove wastes like organic waste and heavy metal from contaminated sites including both soil and water. The advantages of bioremediation are that it is environment-friendly, inexpensive and can remove multiple wastes simultaneously comparing with traditional chemical and physical processes.

== Degradation Process ==
Various microorganisms are involved in a two-stage process of degradation of PCBs, which happens in aerobic and anaerobic environments. Degrading PCBs is similar to the degradation of biphenyl. However, the chlorines on PCBs prevent them from being utilized as a substrate of biphenyl degradation. Due to high chemical stability, PCBs cannot be used as energy sources. However, due to the chlorination, PCBs can be used as electron acceptors in anaerobic respiration to store energy, which is also the first stage of the degradation pathway, reductive dechlorination. Once the PCBs are dechlorinated to a certain degree, usually lower than five chlorines presenting in the structure and one aromatic ring has no chlorine, they can undergo the biphenyl degradation pathway (BP pathway) to be degraded to accessible carbon or CO_{2} in the aerobic environment. BP pathway is a pathway that utilizes series of enzymes (BphA, B, C, D, E, F, G) to convert biphenyl to TCA cycle intermediates (pyruvate and Acyl-CoA) and benzoate. However, there are few microorganisms that can dechlorinate substrate under natural conditions. Even with selective media, the accumulation of PCB dechlorinating microorganisms is still slow, which is one reason for the slow degradation rate. As a result, PCBs usually go through a co-metabolism pathway that involving different microorganism species.

Generally speaking, there are four steps in this process:

1. In order for PCBs to enter the cell, they firstly need to be solubilized.
2. PCBs are dechlorinated by anaerobic bacteria, then transport the metabolites to aerobic bacteria or fungi through a biofilm.
3. The presence of PCBs metabolites triggers the expression of enzymes in BP pathway.
4. PCBs are broken down to Acetyl-CoA and then can be utilized or carbon dioxide.

The Figure below shows the complete degradation pathway.

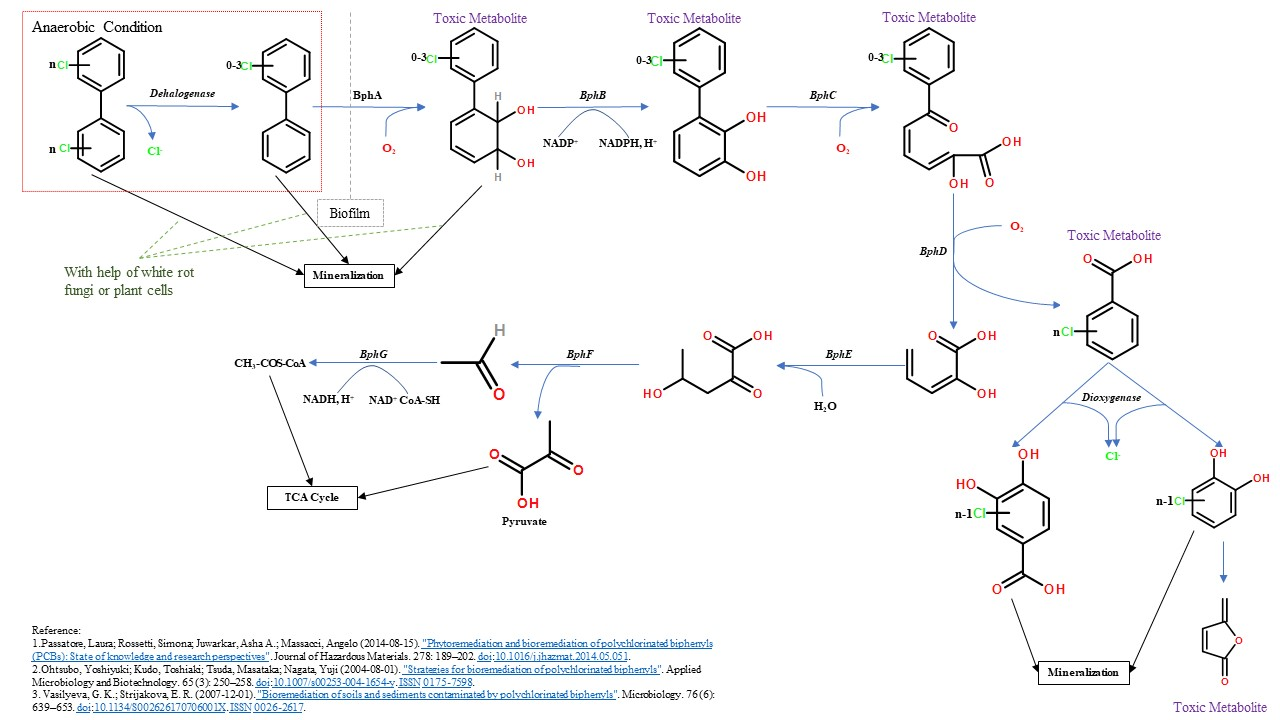

== Limiting Factors ==
=== PCBs entering the cells ===
PCBs have low water solubility, so they adhere tightly to soil and cannot be easily accessed by bacteria. Especially, if the contaminations site has been exposed to PCBs for long period, PCBs can be integrated into soil or sediment matrices, then further decrease their bioavailability. Some surfactants can help solubilize but cannot increase the rate of PCBs degrading. However, if PCBs are linked to surfactants tightly too, then this process cannot promote the absorption of PCBs and even lower it. Also, many surfactants have been proven to be toxic to cells and the high cost of surfactants is another issue.

=== PCBs properties ===
PCBs are toxic to bacterial communities above 1000 mg/kg. However, if the concentration is too low (lower than 50 mg/kg), the degradation slows down significantly, for there is not enough material to stimulate the expression of required genes and support the growth of competent microorganisms. PCBs includes various different compounds with slightly different structures. Those slight differences make big differences in metabolic rate. Generally speaking, the more chlorines in a PCB molecule, the harder for it to be degraded. In particular, microorganisms cannot degrade di- and tetra-ortho substituted well. It is possible that those structures prevent enzymes from accessing reaction sites.

=== Soil and sediment characteristics ===
First, the soil and sediment structures will determine how tightly PCBs are adhered to them and affect the absorption of PCBs into cells. The PCBs’ availability suffers from increasing organic carbon and clay content, for they promote the absorption of PCBs into soil or sediment matrices. Second, the soil contains necessary nutrition for the growth of microbes and anaerobic and aerobic environments. Finally, the local microbial population has significant impacts on the rate of degradation of PCBs, which varies based on the microbial strains and their activities. Then, if there is no history of exposure to PCBs, it may take months for microbes to activates their ability to dechlorinate PCBs and break them down.

=== Gene expression and bottleneck effect of metabolites ===
PCBs or biphenyl cannot provide energy for microbes, so they are primary energy and carbon sources. As stated before it takes months sometimes for microorganisms to activate their gene for dichlorine after the first exposure to PCBs. It has been proposed to use analogs to promote the activation of genes. However, even after the metabolic pathway is activated, the intermediates of the pathway create a bottleneck effect due to their toxicity. Also, there is the possibility that BP pathway leads to protoanemonin which is a dead-end metabolite that cannot be utilized by cells. Due to the high energy cost of this pathway, if no preferred energy source present in the system, cells will not activate this pathway.
