= Polychlorinated biphenyl =

Highly toxic chemical compounds

- Chemical structure of PCBs. The possible positions of chlorine atoms on the benzene rings are denoted by numbers assigned to the carbon atoms.

Identifiers
CAS Number	1336-36-3
ECHA InfoCard	100.014.226
UN number	UN 2315
CompTox Dashboard (EPA)	DTXSID5024267

Properties
Chemical formula	C_{12}H_{10−x}Cl_{x}
Molar mass	Variable
Appearance	Light yellow or colorless, thick, oily liquids

Hazards
NFPA 704 (fire diamond)	1 2 0
- Except where otherwise noted, data are given for materials in their standard state (at 25 °C [77 °F], 100 kPa). Infobox references

PCB warning label on a power transformer known to contain PCBs

Polychlorinated biphenyls (PCBs) are organochlorine compounds with the formula C_{12}H_{10−x}Cl_{x}. They were once widely used in a range of industrial and consumer electronic products including the manufacture of carbonless copy paper, as heat transfer fluids, and as dielectric and coolant fluids for electrical equipment. Some of them are highly toxic and have been classified as carcinogens. This has led to production being banned internationally by the Stockholm Convention on Persistent Organic Pollutants in 2001.

The manufacture of PCBs has declined drastically since the 1960s when problems were identified. With the discovery of PCBs' environmental toxicity, and classification as persistent organic pollutants, their production was banned for most uses by United States federal law on January 1, 1978. However, because of their longevity and widespread use as a coolant in electric transformers, PCBs still persist in built environments.

The International Agency for Research on Cancer (IARC) has classified PCBs as definite carcinogens in humans. According to the U.S. Environmental Protection Agency (EPA), PCBs cause cancer in animals and are probable human carcinogens.

Some PCBs share a structural similarity and toxic mode of action with dioxins. Other toxic effects such as endocrine disruption (notably blocking of thyroid system functioning) and neurotoxicity are known. The bromine analogues of PCBs are polybrominated biphenyls (PBBs), which have similar applications and environmental concerns.

An estimated 1.2 million tons have been produced globally. Though the US EPA enforced the federal ban as of 1978, PCBs continued to create health problems in later years through their continued presence in soil and sediment, and from products which were made before the ban. In 1988, Japanese scientists Tanabe et al. estimated 370,000 tons were in the environment globally, and 780,000 tons were present in products, landfills and dumps, or kept in storage.

== Physical and chemical properties ==
=== Physical properties ===
The compounds are pale-yellow viscous liquids. They are hydrophobic, with low water solubilities: 0.0027–0.42 ng/L for Aroclors brand, but they have high solubilities in most organic solvents, oils, and fats. They have low vapor pressures at room temperature. They have dielectric constants of 2.5–2.7, very high thermal conductivity, and high flash points (from 170 to 380 °C). The density is 1.44 g/cm^{3} at 30 °C. Other physical and chemical properties vary widely across the class. As the degree of chlorination increases, melting point and lipophilicity increase, and vapor pressure and water solubility decrease.

PCBs do not easily break down or degrade, which made them attractive for industries. PCB mixtures are resistant to acids, bases, oxidation, hydrolysis, and temperature change. They can generate extremely toxic dibenzodioxins and dibenzofurans through partial oxidation. Intentional degradation as a treatment of unwanted PCBs generally requires high heat or catalysis (see Methods of destruction below).

PCBs readily penetrate skin, PVC (polyvinyl chloride), and latex (natural rubber). PCB-resistant materials include Viton, polyethylene, polyvinyl acetate (PVA), polytetrafluoroethylene (PTFE), butyl rubber, nitrile rubber, and Neoprene.

=== Structure and toxicity ===
PCBs are derived from biphenyl, which has the formula C_{12}H_{10}, sometimes written (C_{6}H_{5})_{2}. In PCBs, some of the hydrogen atoms in biphenyl are replaced by chlorine atoms. There are 209 different chemical compounds in which one to ten chlorine atoms can replace hydrogen atoms. PCBs are typically used as mixtures of compounds and are given the single identifying CAS number 1336-36-3 . About 130 different individual PCBs are found in commercial PCB products.

Toxic effects vary depending on the specific PCB. In terms of their structure and toxicity, PCBs fall into two distinct categories, referred to as coplanar or non-ortho-substituted arene substitution patterns and noncoplanar or ortho-substituted congeners.

Structures of the twelve dioxin-like PCBs

Coplanar or non-ortho
The coplanar group members have a fairly rigid structure, with their two phenyl rings in the same plane. It renders their structure similar to polychlorinated dibenzo-p-dioxins (PCDDs) and polychlorinated dibenzofurans, and allows them to act like PCDDs, as an agonist of the aryl hydrocarbon receptor (AhR) in organisms. They are considered as contributors to overall dioxin toxicity, and the term dioxins and dioxin-like compounds is often used interchangeably when the environmental and toxic impact of these compounds is considered.

Noncoplanar
Noncoplanar PCBs, with chlorine atoms at the ortho positions can cause neurotoxic and immunotoxic effects, but only at concentrations much higher than those normally associated with dioxins. However, as they are typically found at much higher levels in biological and environmental samples they also pose health concerns, particularly to developing animals (including humans). As they do not activate the AhR, they are not considered part of the dioxin group. Because of their lower overt toxicity, they have typically been of lesser concern to regulatory bodies.

Di-ortho-substituted, non-coplanar PCBs interfere with intracellular signal transduction dependent on calcium which may lead to neurotoxicity. ortho-PCBs can disrupt thyroid hormone transport by binding to transthyretin.

== Mixtures and trade names ==
Commercial PCB mixtures were marketed under the following names:

Brazil

- Ascarel

Czech Republic and Slovakia

- Delor

France

- Phenoclor
- Pyralène (both used by Prodolec)

Germany

- Clophen (used by Bayer)

Italy

- Apirolio
- Fenclor

Japan

- Kanechlor (used by Kanegafuchi)
- Santotherm (used by Mitsubishi)
- Pyroclor

Former USSR

- Sovol
- Sovtol

United Kingdom

- Aroclor xxxx (used by Monsanto Company)
- Askarel

United States

- Aroclor xxxx (used by Monsanto Company)
- Asbestol
- Askarel
- Bakola131
- Chlorextol – Allis-Chalmers trade name
- Dykanol (Cornell-Dubilier)
- Hydol
- Inerteen (used by Westinghouse)
- Noflamol
- Pyranol/Pyrenol, Clorinol (used in General Electric's oil-filled "clorinol"-branded metal can capacitors. Utilized from the early 1960s to late 1970s in air conditioning units, Seeburg jukeboxes and Zenith televisions)
- Saf-T-Kuhl
- Therminol FR Series (Monsanto ceased production in 1971).

=== Aroclor mixtures ===
The only North American producer, Monsanto Company, marketed PCBs under the trade name Aroclor from 1930 to 1977. These were sold under trade names followed by a four-digit number. In general, the first two digits refer to the product series as designated by Monsanto (e.g., 1200 or 1100 series); the second two numbers indicate the percentage of chlorine by mass in the mixture. Thus, Aroclor 1260 is a 1200 series product and contains 60% chlorine by mass. It is a myth that the first two digits referred to the number of carbon atoms; the number of carbon atoms do not change in PCBs. The 1100 series was a crude PCB material which was distilled to create the 1200 series PCB product.

The exception to the naming system is Aroclor 1016 which was produced by distilling 1242 to remove the highly chlorinated congeners to make a more biodegradable product. "1016" was given to this product during Monsanto's research stage for tracking purposes but the name stuck after it was commercialized.

Different Aroclors were used at different times and for different applications. In electrical equipment manufacturing in the US, Aroclor 1260 and Aroclor 1254 were the main mixtures used before 1950; Aroclor 1242 was the main mixture used in the 1950s and 1960s until it was phased out in 1971 and replaced by Aroclor 1016.

== Production ==
One estimate (2006) suggested that 1 million tonnes of PCBs had been produced. 40% of this material was thought to remain in use. Another estimate put the total global production of PCBs on the order of 1.5 million tonnes. The United States was the single largest producer with over 600,000 tonnes produced between 1930 and 1977. The European region follows with nearly 450,000 tonnes through 1984. It is unlikely that a full inventory of global PCB production will ever be accurately tallied, as there were factories in Poland, East Germany, and Austria that produced unknown amounts of PCBs. As of 2002, there were still 21,500 tons of PCBs stored in the easternmost regions of Slovakia.

Although deliberate production of PCBs is banned by international treaty, significant amounts of PCBs are still being "inadvertently" produced. Research suggests that 45,000 tons of 'by-product' PCBs are legally produced per year in the US as part of certain chemical and product formulations.

Commercial production of PCBs was banned in the United States in 1979, with the passage of the Toxic Substances Control Act (TSCA).

== Applications ==
The utility of PCBs is based largely on their chemical stability, including low flammability and high dielectric constant. In an electric arc, PCBs generate incombustible gases.

Use of PCBs is commonly divided into closed and open applications. Examples of closed applications include coolants and insulating fluids (transformer oil) for transformers and capacitors, such as those used in old fluorescent light ballasts, and hydraulic fluids considered a semi-closed application. In contrast, the major open application of PCBs was in carbonless copy ("NCR") paper, which even presently results in paper contamination.

Other open applications were lubricating and cutting oils, and as plasticizers in paints and cements, stabilizing additives in flexible PVC coatings of electrical cables and electronic components, pesticide extenders, reactive flame retardants and sealants for caulking, adhesives, wood floor finishes and other products of Halowax in the U.S., de-dusting agents, waterproofing compounds, casting agents. It was also used as a plasticizer in paints and especially "coal tars" that were used widely to coat water tanks, bridges and other infrastructure pieces.

Modern sources include pigments, which may be used in inks for paper or plastic products. PCBs are also still found in "oil-filled" capacitors, transformers and ballasts in equipment manufactured before 1977, such as X-ray machines and radio transmitters.

== Environmental transport and transformations ==
PCBs have entered the environment through both use and disposal. The environmental fate of PCBs is complex and global in scale.

=== Water ===
Because of their low vapor pressure, PCBs accumulate primarily in the hydrosphere, despite their hydrophobicity, in the organic fraction of soil, and in organisms including the human body. The hydrosphere is the main reservoir. The immense volume of water in the oceans is still capable of dissolving a significant quantity of PCBs.

As the pressure of ocean water increases with depth, PCBs become heavier than water and sink to the deepest ocean trenches where they are concentrated.

=== Air ===
A small volume of PCBs has been detected throughout the Earth's atmosphere. The atmosphere serves as the primary route for global transport of PCBs, particularly for those congeners with one to four chlorine atoms.

In the atmosphere, PCBs may be degraded by hydroxyl radicals, or directly by photolysis of carbon–chlorine bonds (even if this is a less important process).

Atmospheric concentrations of PCBs tend to be lowest in rural areas, where they are typically in the picogram per cubic meter range, higher in suburban and urban areas, and highest in city centers, where they can reach 1 ng/m^{3} or more. In Milwaukee, an atmospheric concentration of 1.9 ng/m^{3} has been measured, and this source alone was estimated to account for 120 kg/year of PCBs entering Lake Michigan. In 2008, concentrations as high as 35 ng/m^{3}, 10 times higher than the EPA guideline limit of 3.4 ng/m^{3}, have been documented inside some houses in the U.S.

Volatilization of PCBs in soil was thought to be the primary source of PCBs in the atmosphere, but research suggests ventilation of PCB-contaminated indoor air from buildings is the primary source of PCB contamination in the atmosphere.

=== Biosphere ===
In the biosphere, PCBs can be degraded by the sun, bacteria or eukaryotes, but the speed of the reaction depends on both the number and the disposition of chlorine atoms in the molecule: less substituted, meta- or para-substituted PCBs undergo biodegradation faster than more substituted congeners.

In bacteria, PCBs may be dechlorinated through reductive dechlorination, or oxidized by dioxygenase enzyme. In eukaryotes, PCBs may be oxidized by the cytochrome P450 enzyme.

Biomagnification is the increasing concentration of a substance, such as a toxic chemical, in the tissues of tolerant organisms at successively higher levels in a food chain.

Like many lipophilic toxins, PCBs undergo biomagnification and bioaccumulation primarily due to the fact that they are easily retained within organisms.

Plastic pollution, specifically microplastics, are a major contributor of PCBs into the biosphere and especially into marine environments. PCBs concentrate in marine environments because freshwater systems, like rivers, act as a bridge for plastic pollution to be transported from terrestrial environments into marine environments. It has been estimated that 88–95% of marine plastic is exported into the ocean by just 10 major rivers.

An organism can accumulate PCBs by consuming other organisms that have previously ingested PCBs from terrestrial, freshwater, or marine environments. The concentration of PCBs within an organism will increase over their lifetime; this process is called bioaccumulation. PCB concentrations within an organism also change depending upon which trophic level they occupy. When an organism occupies a high trophic level, like orcas or humans, they will accumulate more PCBs than an organism that occupies a low trophic level, like phytoplankton. If enough organisms with a trophic level are killed due to the accumulation of toxins, like PCB, a trophic cascade can occur.

PCBs can cause harm to human health or even death when eaten. PCBs can be transported by birds from aquatic sources onto land via feces and carcasses.

== Biochemical metabolism ==
=== Overview ===
PCBs undergo xenobiotic biotransformation, a mechanism used to make lipophilic toxins more polar and more easily excreted from the body. The biotransformation is dependent on the number of chlorine atoms present, along with their position on the rings. Phase I reactions occur by adding an oxygen to either of the benzene rings by Cytochrome P450. The type of P450 present also determines where the oxygen will be added; phenobarbital (PB)-induced P450s catalyze oxygenation to the meta-para positions of PCBs while 3-methylcholanthrene (3MC)-induced P450s add oxygens to the ortho–meta positions. PCBs containing ortho–meta and meta–para protons can be metabolized by either enzyme, making them the most likely to leave the organism. However, some metabolites of PCBs containing ortho–meta protons have increased steric hindrance from the oxygen, causing increased stability and an increased chance of accumulation.

=== Species dependent ===
Metabolism is also dependent on the species of organism; different organisms have slightly different P450 enzymes that metabolize certain PCBs better than others. Looking at the PCB metabolism in the liver of four sea turtle species (green, olive ridley, loggerhead and hawksbill), green and hawksbill sea turtles have noticeably higher hydroxylation rates of PCB 52 than olive ridley or loggerhead sea turtles. This is because the green and hawksbill sea turtles have higher P450 2-like protein expression. This protein adds three hydroxyl groups to PCB 52, making it more polar and water-soluble. P450 3-like protein expression that is thought to be linked to PCB 77 metabolism, something that was not measured in this study.

=== Temperature dependent ===
Temperature plays a key role in the ecology, physiology and metabolism of aquatic species. The rate of PCB metabolism was temperature dependent in yellow perch (Perca flavescens). In fall and winter, only 11 out of 72 introduced PCB congeners were excreted and had halflives of more than 1,000 days. During spring and summer when the average daily water temperature was above 20 °C, persistent PCBs had halflives of 67 days. The main excretion processes were fecal egestion, growth dilution and loss across respiratory surfaces. The excretion rate of PCBs matched with the perch's natural bioenergetics, where most of their consumption, respiration and growth rates occur during the late spring and summer. Since the perch is performing more functions in the warmer months, it naturally has a faster metabolism and has less PCB accumulation. However, multiple cold-water periods mixed with toxic PCBs with coplanar chlorine molecules can be detrimental to perch health.

=== Sex dependent ===
Enantiomers of chiral compounds have similar chemical and physical properties, but can be metabolized by the body differently. This was looked at in bowhead whales (Balaena mysticetus) for two main reasons: they are large animals with slow metabolisms (meaning PCBs will accumulate in fatty tissue) and few studies have measured chiral PCBs in cetaceans. They found that the average PCB concentrations in the blubber were approximately four times higher than the liver; however, this result is most likely age- and sex-dependent. As reproductively active females transferred PCBs and other poisonous substances to the fetus, the PCB concentrations in the blubber were significantly lower than males of the same body length (less than 13 meters).

== Health effects ==
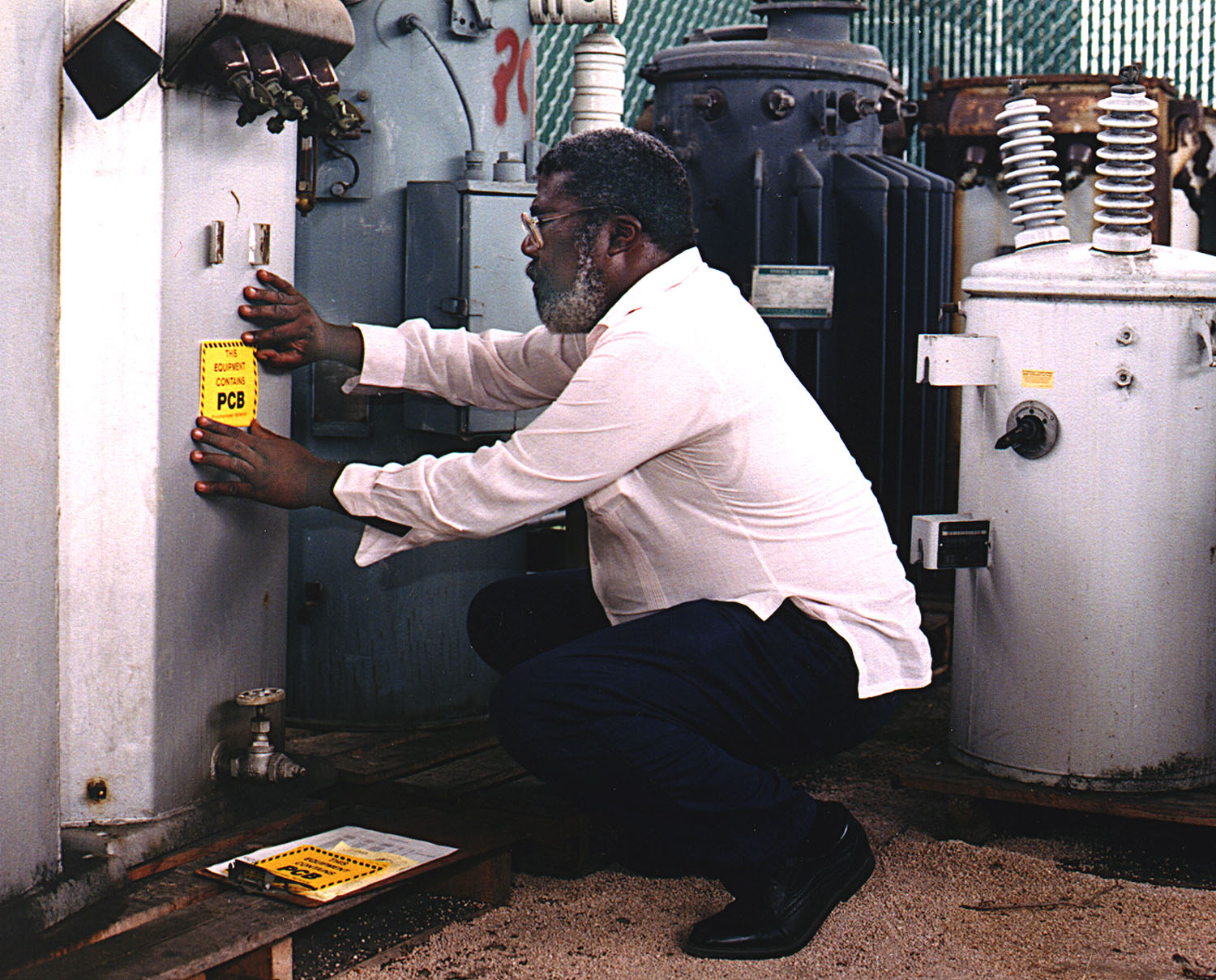
Labelling transformers containing PCBs

The toxicity of PCBs varies considerably among congeners. The coplanar PCBs, known as nonortho PCBs because they are not substituted at the ring positions ortho to (next to) the other ring, (such as PCBs 77, 126 and 169), tend to have dioxin-like properties, and generally are among the most toxic congeners. Because PCBs are almost invariably found in complex mixtures, the concept of toxic equivalency factors (TEFs) has been developed to facilitate risk assessment and regulation, where more toxic PCB congeners are assigned higher TEF values on a scale from 0 to 1. One of the most toxic compounds known, 2,3,7,8-tetrachlorodibenzo[p]dioxin, a PCDD, is assigned a TEF of 1. In June 2020, State Impact of Pennsylvania stated that "In 1979, the EPA banned the use of PCBs, but they still exist in some products produced before 1979. They persist in the environment because they bind to sediments and soils. High exposure to PCBs can cause birth defects, developmental delays, and liver changes."

=== Exposure and excretion ===
In general, people are exposed to PCBs overwhelmingly through food, much less so by breathing contaminated air, and least by skin contact. Once exposed, some PCBs may change to other chemicals inside the body. These chemicals or unchanged PCBs can be excreted in feces or may remain in a person's body for years, with half lives estimated at 10–15 years. PCBs collect in body fat and milk fat. PCBs biomagnify up the food web and are present in fish and overflow of contaminated aquifers. Human infants are exposed to PCBs through breast milk or by intrauterine exposure through transplacental transfer of PCBs and are at the top of the food chain.

Workers recycling old equipment in the electronics recycling industry can also be exposed to PCBs.

=== Signs and symptoms ===
==== Humans ====
The most commonly observed health effects in people exposed to extremely high levels of PCBs are skin conditions, such as chloracne and rashes, but these were known to be symptoms of acute systemic poisoning dating back to 1922. Studies in workers exposed to PCBs have shown changes in blood and urine that may indicate liver damage. In Japan in 1968, 280 kg of PCB-contaminated rice bran oil was used as chicken feed, resulting in a mass poisoning, known as Yushō disease, in over 1800 people. Common symptoms included dermal and ocular lesions, irregular menstrual cycles and lowered immune responses. Other symptoms included fatigue, headaches, coughs, and unusual skin sores. Additionally, in children, there were reports of poor cognitive development. Women exposed to PCBs before or during pregnancy can give birth to children with lowered cognitive ability, compromised immune systems, and motor control problems.

There is evidence that crash dieters that have been exposed to PCBs have an elevated risk of health complications. Stored PCBs in the adipose tissue become mobilized into the blood when individuals begin to crash diet.

PCBs have shown toxic and mutagenic effects by interfering with hormones in the body. PCBs, depending on the specific congener, have been shown to both inhibit and imitate estradiol, the main sex hormone in females. Imitation of the estrogen compound can feed estrogen-dependent breast cancer cells, and possibly cause other cancers, such as uterine or cervical. Inhibition of estradiol can lead to serious developmental problems for both males and females, including sexual, skeletal, and mental development issues. In a cross-sectional study, PCBs were found to be negatively associated with testosterone levels in adolescent boys.

High PCB levels in adults have been shown to result in reduced levels of the thyroid hormone triiodothyronine, which affects almost every physiological process in the body, including growth and development, metabolism, body temperature, and heart rate. It also resulted in reduced immunity and increased thyroid disorders.

==== Animals ====
Animals that eat PCB-contaminated food, even for short periods of time, suffer liver damage and may die. In 1968 in Japan, 400,000 birds died after eating poultry feed that was contaminated with PCBs. Animals that ingest smaller amounts of PCBs in food over several weeks or months develop various health effects, including anemia; acne-like skin conditions (chloracne); liver, stomach, and thyroid gland injuries (including hepatocarcinoma), and thymocyte apoptosis. Other effects of PCBs in animals include changes in the immune system, behavioral alterations, and impaired reproduction. PCBs that have dioxin-like activity are known to cause a variety of teratogenic effects in animals. Exposure to PCBs causes hearing loss and symptoms similar to hypothyroidism in rats.

=== Cancer ===
In 2013, the International Agency for Research on Cancer (IARC) classified dioxin-like PCBs as human carcinogens. According to the U.S. EPA, PCBs have been shown to cause cancer in animals and evidence supports a cancer-causing effect in humans. Per the EPA, studies have found increases in malignant melanoma and rare liver cancers in PCB workers.

In 2013, the IARC determined that the evidence for PCBs causing non-Hodgkin lymphoma is "limited" and "not consistent". In contrast an association between elevated blood levels of PCBs and non-Hodgkin lymphoma had been previously accepted. PCBs may play a role in the development of cancers of the immune system because some tests of laboratory animals subjected to very high doses of PCBs have shown effects on the animals' immune system, and some studies of human populations have reported an association between environmental levels of PCBs and immune response.

=== Lawsuits related to health effects ===
In the early 1990s, Monsanto faced several lawsuits over harm caused by PCBs from workers at companies such as Westinghouse that bought PCBs from Monsanto and used them to build electrical equipment. Monsanto and its customers, such as Westinghouse and GE, also faced litigation from third parties, such as workers at scrap yards that bought used electrical equipment and broke them down to reclaim valuable metals. Monsanto settled some of these cases and won the others, on the grounds that it had clearly told its customers that PCBs were dangerous chemicals and that protective procedures needed to be implemented.

In 2003, Monsanto and Solutia Inc., a Monsanto corporate spin-off, reached a $700 million settlement with the residents of West Anniston, Alabama, who had been affected by the manufacturing and dumping of PCBs. In a trial lasting six weeks, the jury found that "Monsanto had engaged in outrageous behavior, and held the corporations and its corporate successors liable on all six counts it considered – including negligence, nuisance, wantonness and suppression of the truth."

In 2014, the Los Angeles Superior Court found that Monsanto was not liable for cancers claimed to be from PCBs permeating the food supply of three plaintiffs who had developed non-Hodgkin's lymphoma. After a four-week trial, the jury found that Monsanto's production and sale of PCBs between 1935 and 1977 were not substantial causes of the cancer.

In 2015, the cities of Spokane, San Diego, and San Jose initiated lawsuits against Monsanto to recover cleanup costs for PCB contaminated sites, alleging that Monsanto continued to sell PCBs without adequate warnings after they knew of their toxicity. Monsanto issued a media statement concerning the San Diego case, claiming that improper use or disposal by third-parties, of a lawfully sold product, was not the company's responsibility.

In July 2015, a St Louis county court in Missouri found that Monsanto, Solutia, Pharmacia and Pfizer were not liable for a series of deaths and injuries caused by PCBs manufactured by Monsanto Chemical Company until 1977. The trial took nearly a month and the jury took a day of deliberations to return a verdict against the plaintiffs from throughout the USA. Similar cases are ongoing. "The evidence simply doesn't support the assertion that the historic use of PCB products was the cause of the plaintiffs' harms. We are confident that the jury will conclude, as two other juries have found in similar cases, that the former Monsanto Company is not responsible for the alleged injuries," a Monsanto statement said.

In May 2016, a Missouri state jury ordered Monsanto to pay $46.5 million to three plaintiffs whose exposure to PCB caused non-Hodgkin lymphoma.

In December 2016, the state of Washington filed suit in King County. The state sought damages and clean up costs related to PCBs. In March 2018 Ohio Attorney General Mike DeWine also filed a lawsuit against Monsanto over health issues posed by PCBs.

On November 21, 2019, a federal judge denied a bid by Monsanto to dismiss a lawsuit filed by LA County calling the company to clean up cancer-causing PCBs from Los Angeles County waterways and storm sewer pipelines. The lawsuit calls for Monsanto to pay for cleanup of PCBs from dozens of waterways, including the LA River, San Gabriel River and the Dominguez Watershed.

In June 2020, Bayer agreed to pay $650 million to settle local lawsuits related to Monsanto's pollution of public waters in various areas of the United States with PCBs.

In that same month of June 2020, Attorney General Bob Ferguson announced Monsanto will pay 95 million dollar settlement after the 3 year litigation. This litigation began related to the costs of water contamination. PCB contamination is found in 13 bodies of water, where fish advisory warnings have been given from the PCBs that have accumulated in the tissues. Some of the consequences, include affecting other aspects of the ecosystem, such as contamination on bays, soil and other related species like birds and other animal life.

In 2023, over 90 Vermont school districts joined a lawsuit against Monsanto alleging that PCBs created by the company were used in the construction of their schools. The Vermont Attorney General's office also filed its own lawsuit against Monsanto related to the use of its PCBs.

A settlement between Monsanto and students, parents and staff of Monroe school occurred in August 2025. The legal campaign started in 2018, where the plaintiffs alleged Monsanto knew about the toxicity of PCBs that were used in the school infrastructure. Not only did the school not remove the banned material to ensure safety of students, but Monsanto themselves knew of the health implications of PCBs before they were banned.

Further controversy occurred because evidence obtained by the Washington state who is in an ongoing legal battle with Monsanto shows that they knew of the risks of PCBs before the 1979 ban, based on over 20,000 internal documents.

In October 2025, NC state university filed a lawsuit against Monsanto over PCBs used in construction of Poe Hall on campus in 1971. The National Institute for Occupational Safety and Health is currently evaluating the health hazards.

== History ==
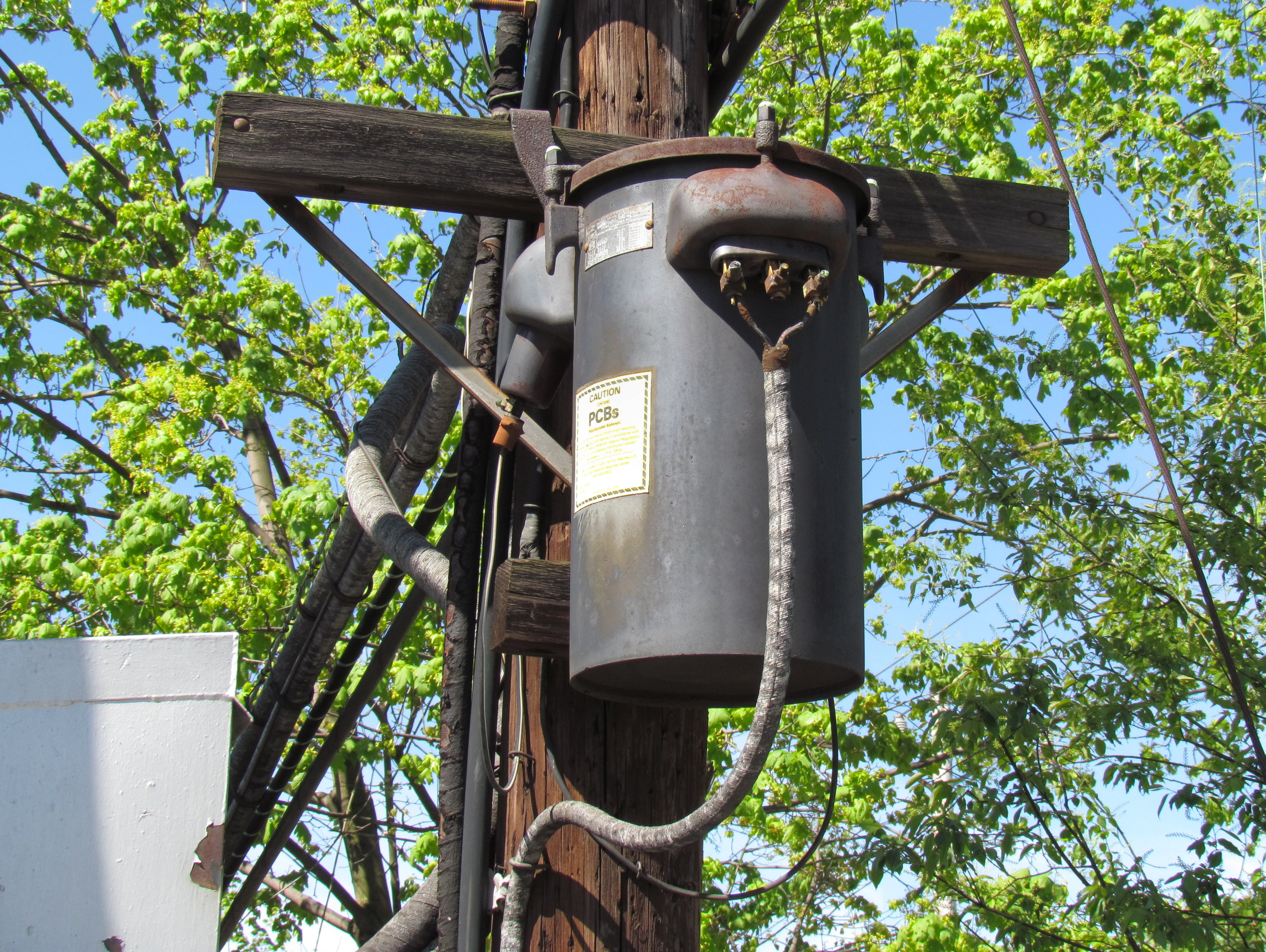
Old power transformers are a major source of PCBs. Even units not originally filled with PCB may be contaminated, since PCB and oil mix freely and any given transformer may have been refilled from hoses or tanks also used with PCBs.

In 1865, the first "PCB-like" chemical was discovered, and was found to be a byproduct of coal tar. Years later in 1876, German chemist Oscar Döbner (Doebner) synthesized the first PCB in a laboratory. Since then, large amounts of PCBs were released into the environment, to the extent that there are even measurable amounts of PCBs in feathers of birds currently held in museums before the production of PCBs peaked.

In 1935, Monsanto Chemical Company (later Solutia Inc) took over commercial production of PCBs from Swann Chemical Company which had begun in 1929. PCBs, originally termed "chlorinated diphenyls", were commercially produced as mixtures of isomers at different degrees of chlorination. The electric industry used PCBs as a non-flammable replacement for mineral oil to cool and insulate industrial transformers and capacitors. PCBs were also commonly used as heat stabilizer in cables and electronic components to enhance the heat and fire resistance of PVC.

In the 1930s, the toxicity associated with PCBs and other chlorinated hydrocarbons, including polychlorinated naphthalenes, was recognized because of a variety of industrial incidents. Between 1936 and 1937, there were several medical cases and papers released on the possible link between PCBs and its detrimental health effects. In 1936, a U.S. Public health Service official described the wife and child of a worker from the Monsanto Industrial Chemical Company who exhibited blackheads and pustules on their skin. The official attributed these symptoms to contact with the worker's clothing after he returned from work. In 1937, a conference about the hazards was organized at Harvard School of Public Health, and a number of publications referring to the toxicity of various chlorinated hydrocarbons were published before 1940.

In 1947, Robert Brown reminded chemists that Arochlors were "objectionably toxic": "Thus the maximum permissible concentration for an 8-hr. day is 1 mg. per cu.m. [1.0 mg/m^{3}] of air. They also produce a serious and disfiguring dermatitis".

In 1954, Kanegafuchi Chemical Co. Ltd. (Kaneka Corporation) first produced PCBs, and continued until 1972.

Through the 1960s Monsanto Chemical Company knew increasingly more about PCBs' harmful effects on humans and the environment, per internal leaked documents released in 2002, yet PCB manufacture and use continued with few restraints until the 1970s.

In 1966, PCBs were determined by Swedish chemist Sören Jensen to be an environmental contaminant. Jensen, according to a 1994 article in Sierra, named chemicals PCBs, which previously, had simply been called "phenols" or referred to by various trade names, such as Aroclor, Kanechlor, Pyrenol, Chlorinol and others. In 1972, PCB production plants existed in Austria, West Germany, France, the UK, Italy, Japan, Spain, the USSR and the US.

In the early 1970s, Ward B. Stone of the New York State Department of Environmental Conservation (NYSDEC) first published his findings that PCBs were leaking from transformers and had contaminated the soil at the bottom of utility poles.

There have been allegations that Industrial Bio-Test Laboratories engaged in data falsification in testing relating to PCBs. In 2003, Monsanto and Solutia Inc., a Monsanto corporate spinoff, reached a US$700 million settlement with the residents of West Anniston, Alabama, who had been affected by the manufacturing and dumping of PCBs. In a trial lasting six weeks, the jury found that "Monsanto had engaged in outrageous behavior, and held the corporations and its corporate successors liable on all six counts it considered – including negligence, nuisance, wantonness and suppression of the truth."

Existing products containing PCBs which are "totally enclosed uses" such as insulating fluids in transformers and capacitors, vacuum pump fluids, and hydraulic fluid, are allowed to remain in use in the US. The public, legal, and scientific concerns about PCBs arose from research indicating they are likely carcinogens having the potential to adversely impact the environment and, therefore, undesirable as commercial products. Despite active research spanning five decades, extensive regulatory actions, and an effective ban on their production since the 1970s, PCBs still persist in the environment and remain a focus of attention.

== Pollution due to PCBs ==
=== Belgium ===
In 1999, the Dioxin Affair occurred when 50 kg of PCB transformer oils were added to a stock of recycled fat used for the production of 500 tonnes of animal feed, eventually affecting around 2,500 farms in several countries. The name Dioxin Affair was coined from early misdiagnosis of dioxins as the primary contaminants, when in fact they turned out to be a relatively small part of the contamination caused by thermal reactions of PCBs. The PCB congener pattern suggested the contamination was from a mixture of Aroclor 1260 and 1254. Over 9 million chickens, and 60,000 pigs were destroyed because of the contamination. The extent of human health effects has been debated, in part because of the use of differing risk assessment methods. One group predicted increased cancer rates, and increased rates of neurological problems in those exposed as neonates. A second study suggested carcinogenic effects were unlikely and that the primary risk would be associated with developmental effects due to exposure in pregnancy and neonates. Two businessmen who knowingly sold the contaminated feed ingredient received two-year suspended sentences for their role in the crisis.

=== Italy ===
The Italian company Caffaro, located in Brescia, specialized in producing PCBs from 1938 to 1984, following the acquisition of the exclusive rights to use the patent in Italy from Monsanto. The pollution resulting from this factory and the case of Anniston, in the US, are the largest known cases in the world of PCB contamination in water and soil, in terms of the amount of toxic substance dispersed, size of the area contaminated, number of people involved and duration of production.

The values reported by the local health authority (ASL) of Brescia since 1999 are 5,000 times above the limits set by Ministerial Decree 471/1999 (levels for residential areas, 0.001 mg/kg). As a result of this and other investigations, in June 2001, a complaint of an environmental disaster was presented to the Public Prosecutor's Office of Brescia. Research on the adult population of Brescia showed that residents of some urban areas, former workers of the plant, and consumers of contaminated food, have PCB levels in their bodies that are in many cases 10–20 times higher than reference values in comparable general populations. PCBs entered the human food supply by animals grazing on contaminated pastures near the factory, especially in local veal mostly eaten by farmers' families. The exposed population showed an elevated risk of Non-Hodgkin lymphoma, but not for other specific cancers.

=== Japan ===
In 1968, a mixture of dioxins and PCBs got into rice bran oil produced in northern Kyushu. Contaminated cooking oil sickened more than 1,860 people. The symptoms were called Yushō disease.

In Okinawa, high levels of PCB contamination in soil on Kadena Air Base were reported in 1987 at thousands of parts per million, some of the highest levels found in any pollution site in the world.

=== Republic of Ireland ===
In December 2008, a number of Irish news sources reported testing had revealed "extremely high" levels of dioxins, by toxic equivalent, in pork products, ranging from 80 to 200 times the European Union's upper safe limit of 1.5 pg WHO-TEQ_{DFP}/μg i.e. 0.12 to 0.3 parts per billion.

Brendan Smith, the Minister for Agriculture, Fisheries and Food, stated the pork contamination was caused by PCB-contaminated feed that was used on 9 of Ireland's 400 pig farms, and only one feed supplier was involved. Smith added that 38 beef farms also used the same contaminated feed, but those farms were quickly isolated and no contaminated beef entered the food chain. While the contamination was limited to just 9 pig farms, the Irish government requested the immediate withdrawal and disposal of all pork-containing products produced in Ireland and purchased since September 1, 2008. This request for withdrawal of pork products was confirmed in a press release by the Food Safety Authority of Ireland on December 6.

It is thought that the incident resulted from the contamination of fuel oil used in a drying burner at a single feed processor, with PCBs. The resulting combustion produced a highly toxic mixture of PCBs, dioxins and furans, which was included in the feed produced and subsequently fed to a large number of pigs.

=== Kenya ===
In Kenya, a number of cases have been reported in the 2010s of thieves selling transformer oil, stolen from electric transformers, to the operators of roadside food stalls for use in deep frying. When used for frying, it is reported that transformer oil lasts much longer than regular cooking oil. The downside of this misuse of the transformer oil is the threat to the health of the consumers, due to the presence of PCBs.

=== Slovakia ===
The chemical plant Chemko in Strážske (east Slovakia) was an important producer of polychlorinated biphenyls for the former communist bloc (Comecon) until 1984. Chemko contaminated a large part of east Slovakia, especially the sediments of the Laborec river and reservoir Zemplínska šírava.

=== Slovenia ===
Between 1962 and 1983, the Iskra Kondenzatorji company in Semič (White Carniola, Southeast Slovenia) manufactured capacitors using PCBs. Due to the wastewater and improperly disposed waste products, the area (including the Krupa and Lahinja rivers) became highly contaminated with PCBs. The pollution was discovered in 1983, when the Krupa river was meant to become a water supply source. The area was sanitized then, but the soil and water are still highly polluted. Traces of PCBs were found in food (eggs, cow milk, walnuts) and Krupa is still the most PCB-polluted river in the world.

=== Spain and Portugal ===
Several cetacean species have very high mean blubber PCB concentrations likely to cause population declines and suppress population recovery. Striped dolphins, bottlenose dolphins and orcas were found to have mean levels that markedly exceeded all known marine mammal PCB toxicity thresholds. The western Mediterranean Sea and the south-west Iberian Peninsula were identified as "hotspots".

=== United Kingdom ===
Monsanto manufactured PCBs at its chemical plant in Newport, South Wales, until the mid- to late-1970s. During this period, waste matter, including PCBs, from the Newport site was dumped at a disused quarry near Groes-faen, west of Cardiff, and Penhros landfill site from where it continues to be released in waste water discharges.

=== United States ===
Monsanto was the only company that manufactured PCBs in the US. Its production was entirely halted in 1977. (Kimbrough, 1987, 1995) On November 25, 2020, U.S. District Judge Fernando M. Olguin rejected a proposed $650 million settlement from Bayer, the company which acquired Monsanto in 2018, and allowed Monsanto-related lawsuits involving PCB to proceed.

==== Alabama ====
PCBs originating from Monsanto Chemical Company in Anniston, Alabama, were dumped into Snow Creek, which then spread to Choccolocco Creek, then Logan Martin Lake. In the early 2000s, class action lawsuits were settled by local land owners, including those on Logan Martin Lake, and Lay Reservoir (downstream on the Coosa River), for the PCB pollution. Donald Stewart, former Senator from Alabama, first learned of the concerns of hundreds of west Anniston residents after representing a church which had been approached about selling its property by Monsanto. Stewart went on to be the pioneer and lead attorney in the first and majority of cases against Monsanto and focused on residents in the immediate area known to be most polluted. Other attorneys later joined in to file suits for those outside the main immediate area around the plant; one of these was the late Johnnie Cochran.

In 2007, the highest pollution levels remained concentrated in Snow and Choccolocco Creeks. Concentrations in fish have declined and continue to decline over time; sediment disturbance, however, can resuspend the PCBs from the sediment back into the water column and food web.

==== California ====
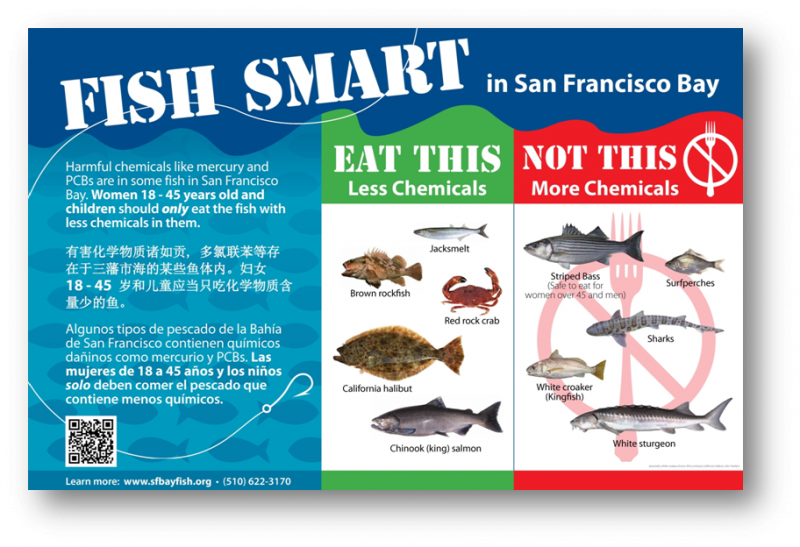
Fish consumption advisory poster for San Francisco Bay

San Francisco Bay has been contaminated by PCBs, "a legacy of PCBs spread widely across the land surface of the watershed, mixed deep into the sediment of the Bay, and contaminating the Bay food web". Levels of PCBs in fish and shellfish exceed thresholds for safe consumption. Signs around the Bay warn anglers of which species to avoid. State water quality regulators set a Total Maximum Daily Load for PCBs require city and county governments around the Bay to implement control measures to limit PCBs in urban runoff. An important part of the second, revised version of this permit was the requirement for municipalities to install green infrastructure with a goal of reducing pollutant levels in stormwater.

==== Connecticut ====
In New Haven, the decommissioned English Station has a high concentration of PCB contamination due to the chemicals used in the running of the plant. This, along with asbestos contamination, has made cleaning and demolishing the abandoned site extremely difficult. The PCB contamination has spread to the soil, and to the river, where locals will sometimes fish unaware of the danger.

==== Great Lakes ====
In 1976, environmentalists found PCBs in the sludge at Waukegan Harbor, the southwest end of Lake Michigan. They were able to trace the source of the PCBs back to the Outboard Marine Corporation that was producing boat motors next to the harbor. By 1982, the Outboard Marine Corporation was court-ordered to release quantitative data referring to their PCB waste released. The data stated that from 1954 they released 100,000 tons of PCB into the environment, and that the sludge contained PCBs in concentrations as high as 50%.

In 1989, during construction near the Zilwaukee bridge, workers uncovered an uncharted landfill containing PCB-contaminated waste which cost $100,000 to clean up.

Much of the Great Lakes area were still heavily polluted with PCBs in 1988, despite extensive remediation work.

==== Indiana ====
From the late 1950s through 1977, Westinghouse Electric used PCBs in the manufacture of capacitors in its Bloomington, Indiana, plant. Reject capacitors were hauled and dumped in area salvage yards and landfills, including Bennett's Dump, Neal's Landfill and Lemon Lane Landfill. Workers also dumped PCB oil down factory drains, which contaminated the city sewage treatment plant. The City of Bloomington gave away the sludge to area farmers and gardeners, creating anywhere from 200 to 2,000 sites, which remain unaddressed.

Over 1,000 tons of PCBs were estimated to have been dumped in Monroe and Owen counties. Although federal and state authorities have been working on the sites' environmental remediation, many areas remain contaminated. Concerns have been raised regarding the removal of PCBs from the karst limestone topography, and regarding the possible disposal options. To date, the Westinghouse Bloomington PCB Superfund site case does not have a Remedial Investigation/Feasibility Study (RI/FS) and Record of Decision (ROD), although Westinghouse signed a US Department of Justice Consent Decree in 1985. The 1985 consent decree required Westinghouse to construct an incinerator that would incinerate PCB-contaminated materials. Because of public opposition to the incinerator, however, the State of Indiana passed a number of laws that delayed and blocked its construction. The parties to the consent decree began to explore alternative remedies in 1994 for six of the main PCB contaminated sites in the consent decree. Hundreds of sites remain unaddressed as of 2014. Monroe County will never be PCB-free, as noted in a 2014 Indiana University program about the local contamination.

On February 15, 2008, Monroe County approved a plan to clean up the three remaining contaminated sites in the City of Bloomington, at a cost of $9.6 million to CBS Corp., the successor of Westinghouse. In 1999, Viacom bought CBS, so they are current responsible party for the PCB sites.

==== Massachusetts ====
Pittsfield, in western Massachusetts, was home to the General Electric (GE) transformer, capacitor, and electrical generating equipment divisions. The electrical generating division built and repaired equipment that was used to power the electrical utility grid throughout the nation. PCB-contaminated oil routinely migrated from GE's 254-acre (1.03 km^{2}) industrial plant located in the very center of the city to the surrounding groundwater, nearby Silver Lake, and to the Housatonic River, which flows through Massachusetts, Connecticut, and down to Long Island Sound. PCB-containing solid material was widely used as fill, including oxbows of the Housatonic River. Fish and waterfowl which live in and around the river contain significant levels of PCBs and are not safe to eat. EPA designated the Pittsfield plant and several miles of the river as a Superfund site in 1997, and ordered GE to remediate the site. EPA and GE began a cleanup of the area in 1999.

New Bedford Harbor, which is a listed Superfund site, contained some of the highest sediment concentrations of PCBs in the marine environment. Cleanup of the area began in 1994 and is mostly complete as of 2020.

Investigations into historic waste dumping in the Bliss Corner neighborhood have revealed the existence of PCBs, among other hazardous materials, buried in soil and waste material.

==== Missouri ====
In 1982, Martha C. Rose Chemical Inc. began processing and disposing of materials contaminated with PCBs in Holden, Missouri, a small rural community about 40 miles (64 km) east of Kansas City. From 1982 until 1986, nearly 750 companies, including General Motors Corp., Commonwealth Edison, Illinois Power Co. and West Texas Utilities, sent millions of pounds of PCB contaminated materials to Holden for disposal. Instead, according to prosecutors, the company began storing the contaminated materials while falsifying its reports to the EPA to show they had been removed. After investigators learned of the deception, Rose Chemical was closed and filed for bankruptcy. The site had become the nation's largest waste site for the chemical PCB. In the four years the company was operational, the EPA inspected it four times and assessed $206,000 in fines but managed to collect only $50,000.

After the plant closed the state environmental agency found PCB contamination in streams near the plant and in the city's sewage treatment sludge. A 100,000 square-foot warehouse and unknown amounts of contaminated soil and water around the site had to be cleaned up. Most of the surface debris, including close to 13 million pounds of contaminated equipment, carcasses and tanks of contaminated oil, had to be removed. Walter C. Carolan, owner of Rose Chemical, and five others pleaded guilty in 1989 to committing fraud or falsifying documents. Carolan and two other executives served sentences of less than 18 months; the others received fines and were placed on probation. Cleanup costs at the site are estimated at $35 million.

==== Montana ====
Two launch facilities at Malmstrom Air Force Base showed PCB levels higher than the thresholds recommended by the Environmental Protection Agency when extensive sampling began of active U.S. intercontinental ballistic missile bases to address specific cancer concerns in 2023.

==== New York ====
Pollution of the Hudson River is largely due to dumping of PCBs by General Electric from 1947 to 1977. GE dumped an estimated 1.3 million pounds of PCBs into the Hudson River during these years. The PCBs came from the company's two capacitor manufacturing plants at Hudson Falls and Fort Edward, New York. This pollution caused a range of harmful effects to wildlife and people who eat fish from the river or drink the water. In 1984, EPA declared a 200-mile (320 km) stretch of the river, from Hudson Falls to New York City, to be a Superfund site requiring cleanup. Extensive remediation actions on the river began in the 1970s with the implementation of wastewater discharge permits and consequent control or reduction of wastewater discharges, and sediment removal operations, which have continued into the 21st century.

Love Canal is a neighborhood in Niagara Falls, New York, that was heavily contaminated with toxic waste including PCBs. Eighteen Mile Creek in Lockport, New York, is an EPA Superfund site for PCBs contamination.

PCB pollution at the State Office Building in Binghamton was responsible for what is now considered to be the first indoor environmental disaster in the United States. In 1981, a transformer explosion in the basement spewed PCBs throughout the entire 18-story building. The contamination was so severe that cleanup efforts kept the building closed for 13 years.

==== North Carolina ====
One of the largest deliberate PCB spills in American history occurred in the summer of 1978 when 31,000 gallons (117 m^3) of PCB-contaminated oil were illegally sprayed by the Ward PCB Transformer Company in 3-foot (0.91 m) swaths along the roadsides of some 240 miles (390 km) of North Carolina highway shoulders in 14 counties and at the Fort Bragg Army Base. The crime, known as "the midnight dumpings", occurred over nearly two weeks, as drivers of a black-painted tanker truck drove down one side of rural Piedmont highways spraying PCB-laden waste and then up the other side the following night.

Under Governor James B. Hunt, Jr., state officials then erected large, yellow warning signs along the contaminated highways that read: "CAUTION: PCB Chemical Spills Along Highway Shoulders". The illegal dumping is believed to have been motivated by the passing of the Toxic Substances Control Act (TSCA), which became effective on August 2, 1978, and increased the expense of chemical waste disposal.

Within a couple of weeks of the crime, Robert Burns and his sons, Timothy and Randall, were arrested for dumping the PCBs along the roadsides. Burns was a business partner of Robert "Buck" Ward Jr., of the Ward PCB Transformer Company, in Raleigh. Burns and sons pleaded guilty to state and Federal criminal charges; Burns received a three to five-year prison sentence. Ward was acquitted of state charges in the dumping, but was sentenced to 18 months prison time for violation of TSCA.

Cleanup and disposal of the roadside PCBs generated controversy, as the Governor's plan to pick up the roadside PCBs and to bury them in a landfill in rural Warren County were strongly opposed in 1982 by local residents.

In October 2013, at the request of the South Carolina Department of Health and Environmental Control (SCDHEC), the City of Charlotte, North Carolina, decided to stop applying sewage sludge to land while authorities investigated the source of PCB contamination. In February 2014, the City of Charlotte admitted PCBs have entered their sewage treatment centers as well.

After the 2013 SCDHEC had issued emergency regulations, the City of Charlotte discovered high levels of PCBs entering its sewage waste water treatment plants, where sewage is converted to sewage sludge. The city at first denied it had a problem, then admitted an "event" occurred in February 2014, and in April that the problem had occurred much earlier. The city stated that its very first test with a newly changed test method revealed very high PCB levels in its sewage sludge farm field fertilizer. Because of the widespread use of the contaminated sludge, SCDHEC subsequently issued PCB fish advisories for nearly all streams and rivers bordering farm fields that had been applied with city waste.

==== Ohio ====
The Clyde cancer cluster (also known as the Sandusky County cancer cluster) is a childhood cancer cluster that has affected many families in Clyde, Ohio, and surrounding areas. PCBs were found in soil in a public park within the area of the cancer cluster.

In Akron, Ohio, soil was contaminated and noxious PCB-laden fumes had been put into the air by an electrical transformer deconstruction operation from the 1930s to the 1960s.

==== South Carolina ====
From 1955 until 1977, the Sangamo Weston plant in Pickens, South Carolina, used PCBs to manufacture capacitors, and dumped 400,000 pounds of PCB contaminated wastewater into the Twelve Mile Creek. In 1990, the EPA declared the 228 acres (0.92 km^{2}) site of the capacitor plant, its landfills and the polluted watershed, which stretches nearly 1,000 acres (4.0 km^{2}) downstream to Lake Hartwell as a Superfund site. Two dams on the Twelve Mile Creek are to be removed and on Feb. 22, 2011 the first of two dams began to be dismantled. Some contaminated sediment is being removed from the site and hauled away, while other sediment is pumped into a series of settling ponds.

In 2013, the state environmental regulators issued a rare emergency order, banning all sewage sludge from being land applied or deposited on landfills, as it contained very high levels of PCBs. The problem had not been discovered until thousands of acres of farm land in the state had been contaminated by the hazardous sludge. A criminal investigation to determine the perpetrator of this crime was launched.

==== Washington ====
As of 2015, several bodies of water in the state of Washington were contaminated with PCBs, including the Columbia River, the Duwamish River, Green Lake, Lake Washington, the Okanogan River, Puget Sound, the Spokane River, the Walla Walla River, the Wenatchee River, and the Yakima River. A study by Washington State published in 2011 found that the two largest sources of PCB flow into the Spokane River were City of Spokane stormwater (44%) and municipal and industrial discharges (20%).

PCBs entered the environment through paint, hydraulic fluids, sealants, inks and have been found in river sediment and wildlife. Spokane utilities will spend $300 million to prevent PCBs from entering the river in anticipation of a 2017 federal deadline to do so. In August 2015 Spokane joined other U.S. cities like San Diego and San Jose, California, and Westport, Massachusetts, in seeking damages from Monsanto.

==== Wisconsin ====
From 1954 until 1971, the Fox River in Appleton, Wisconsin, had PCBs deposited into it from Appleton Paper/NCR, P.H. Gladfelter, Georgia-Pacific and other notable local paper manufacturing facilities. The Wisconsin DNR estimates that after wastewater treatment the PCB discharges to the Fox River due to production losses ranged from 81,000 kg to 138,000 kg. (178,572 lbs. to 304,235 lbs). The production of Carbon Copy Paper and its byproducts led to the discharge into the river. Fox River clean up is ongoing.

=== Pacific Ocean ===
Polychlorinated biphenyls have been discovered in organisms living in the Mariana Trench in the Pacific Ocean. Levels were as high as 1,900 nanograms per gram of amphipod tissue in the organisms analyzed.

== Regulation ==
=== Japan ===
In 1972 the Japanese government banned the production, use, and import of PCBs.

=== Sweden ===
In 1973, the use of PCBs in "open" or "dissipative" sources (such as plasticizers in paints and cements, casting agents, fire retardant fabric treatments and heat stabilizing additives for PVC electrical insulation, adhesives, paints and waterproofing, railroad ties) was banned in Sweden.

=== United Kingdom ===
In 1981, the UK banned closed uses of PCBs in new equipment, and nearly all UK PCB synthesis ceased; closed uses in existing equipment containing in excess of 5 litres of PCBs were not stopped until December 2000.

=== United States ===
In 1976, concern over the toxicity and persistence (chemical stability) of PCBs in the environment led the United States Congress to ban their domestic production, effective January 1, 1978, pursuant to the Toxic Substances Control Act. To implement the law, EPA banned new manufacturing of PCBs, but issued regulations that allowed for their continued use in electrical equipment for economic reasons. EPA began issuing regulations for PCB usage and disposal in 1979. The agency has issued guidance publications for safe removal and disposal of PCBs from existing equipment.

EPA defined the "maximum contaminant level goal" for public water systems as zero, but because of the limitations of water treatment technologies, a level of 0.5 parts per billion is the actual regulated level (maximum contaminant level).

== Methods of destruction ==
=== Physical ===
PCBs were technically attractive because of their inertness, which includes their resistance to combustion. Nonetheless, they can be effectively destroyed by incineration at 1000 °C. When combusted at lower temperatures, they convert in part to more hazardous unintentional persistent organic pollutants, including polychlorinated dibenzofurans and dibenzo-p-dioxins. When conducted properly, the combustion products are water, carbon dioxide, and hydrogen chloride. In some cases, the PCBs are combusted as a solution in kerosene. PCBs have also been destroyed by pyrolysis in the presence of alkali metal carbonates.

Thermal desorption is highly effective at removing PCBs from soil.

=== Chemical ===
PCBs are fairly chemically unreactive; they resist oxidation and hydrolysis commonly encountered in industrial applications, alongside high thermal stability and electrical resistivity, low water solubility and flammability, and resistance to acids and bases. These properties make it attractive for its use in industry.

Many chemical compounds are available to destroy or reduce the PCBs. Commonly, PCBs are degraded by basic mixtures of glycols, which displace some or all chloride. Also effective are reductants such as sodium or sodium naphthalene. Vitamin B12 has also shown promise.

=== Microbial ===
The use of microorganisms to degrade PCBs from contaminated sites, relying on multiple microorganisms' co-metabolism, is known as bioremediation of polychlorinated biphenyl. Some micro-organisms degrade PCBs by reducing the C-Cl bonds. Microbial dechlorination tends to be rather slow-acting in comparison to other methods. Enzymes extracted from microbes can show PCB activity. In 2005, Shewanella oneidensis biodegraded a high percentage of PCBs in soil samples. A low voltage current can stimulate the microbial degradation of PCBs.

=== Fungal ===
There is research showing that some ligninolytic fungi can degrade PCBs.

== Bioremediation ==
The remediation, or removal, of PCBs from estuarian and coastal river sediments is quite difficult due to the overlying water column and the potential for resuspension of contaminants during the removal process. The most common method of PCB extraction from sediments is to dredge an area and dispose of the sediments in a landfill. This method is troubling for a number of reasons, namely that it has a risk of resuspension of the chemicals as the sediments are disturbed, and this method can be very damaging to ecosystems.

A potential cost effective, low risk remediation technique is bioremediation. Bioremediation involves the use of biota to remediate sediments. Phytoremediation, the use of plants to remediate soils, has been found to be effective for a broad range of contaminants such as mercury, PCB, and PAHs in terrestrial soils. A promising study conducted in New Bedford Harbor found that Ulva rigida, a type of seaweed common throughout the world, is effective at removing PCB from sediments. During a typical bloom in New Bedford Harbor, U. rigida forms a thick mat that lies on top of and in contact with the sediment. This allows for U. rigida to uptake large amounts of PCB from the sediment with concentrations of PCB in U. rigida reaching 1580 μg kg^{−1} within 24 hours of the bloom. Live tissue tended to take up higher concentrations of PCB than dead tissue, but this is not to say that dead tissue did not still take up large amounts of PCB as well.

== Homologs ==
For a complete list of the 209 PCB congeners, see PCB congener list. Note that biphenyl, while not technically a PCB congener because of its lack of chlorine substituents, is still typically included in the literature.

PCB homolog	CASRN	Cl substituents	Number of congeners
Biphenyl (not a PCB)	92-52-4	0	1
Monochlorobiphenyl	27323-18-8	1	3
Dichlorobiphenyl	25512-42-9	2	12
Trichlorobiphenyl	25323-68-6	3	24
Tetrachlorobiphenyl	26914-33-0	4	42
Pentachlorobiphenyl	25429-29-2	5	46
Hexachlorobiphenyl	26601-64-9	6	42
Heptachlorobiphenyl	28655-71-2	7	24
Octachlorobiphenyl	55722-26-4	8	12
Nonachlorobiphenyl	53742-07-7	9	3
Decachlorobiphenyl	2051-24-3	10	1

== See also ==
- Bay mud
- Organochlorine compound
- Polybrominated biphenyl
- Zodiac, a novel by Neal Stephenson which involves PCBs and their impact on the environment.
