= Anti-degradant =

An anti-degradant, or deterioration inhibitor is an ingredient in rubber compounds to deter the aging of rubber products.

Anti-degradants include antioxidants and antiozonants. Since the aging of rubber is caused largely by oxygen, materials that quickly react with oxygen can be used as anti-degradant depending on the type of rubber, although organic compounds that easily react with oxygen are recommended for use as anti-degradant (chemical antioxidant).

On the other hand, the surface of rubber is sometimes covered with materials that do not easily react with oxygen to prevent direct contact between rubber and oxygen (physical anti-degradant, e.g., wax products).

Chemical antioxidants are classified into amine type anti-degradant and phenolic type anti-degradant depending on the chemical composition or into polymer stabilizers, thermal anti-degradants, and deterioration inhibitors depending on the major aging action; in many cases, however, it is difficult to distinguish their effects.

Anti-degradants are further classified into staining anti-degradants or non-staining anti-degradants depending on whether or not rubber is colored, discolored, or otherwise stained.
