= Unicity (disambiguation) =

Unicity refers to various things.

As a city-zoning and city unification term, unicity may refer to:

- A section of the city of Winnipeg, Manitoba
- The unification of the City of Cape Town's local government
- The 1971 City of Winnipeg Act, which is often called unicity.
- Unicity is a European city in which students from Turkish and German schools co-create in the Cospaces environment within the eTwinning project in 2018.

== Other ==
- A unicity theorem, often called a uniqueness theorem
- Unicity (computer science), a measure of the ease of re-identification of individuals in sets of metadata
- Unicity distance, a term in cryptography
- Unicity, an album by Edward Simon
- Unicity (philosophy), a concept that explains the particularity of each entity
