= Biobank ethics =

Ethics pertaining to all aspects of biobanks

Biobank ethics refers to the ethics pertaining to all aspects of biobanks. The issues examined in the field of biobank ethics are special cases of clinical research ethics.

== Overview of issues ==
The following table shows many of the leading controversial issues related to biobanking. The table names an issue, then describes a point on which there is consensus and an aspect of that same point for which there is no consensus.

Biobank controversies
| issue | consensus | controversy | notes |
|---|---|---|---|
| Commercialization | Different aspects of biobanks serve public, private, commercial, and noncommercial interests. | How can policymakers set guidelines to fairly balance public, private, commercial, and noncommercial interests? | |
| Commercialization | Different aspects of biobanks serve public, private, commercial, and noncommercial interests. | Who owns biological specimens and data derived therefrom? | |
| Commercialization | Different aspects of biobanks serve public, private, commercial, and noncommercial interests. | When biobanks and related projects are publicly funded, the result will benefit private industry. To what extent is this outcome satisfactory? (Social Fairness). It may also undermine public trust in biobanks projects. | |
| Commercialization | Different aspects of biobanks serve public, private, commercial, and noncommercial interests. | It may skew research agenda in favor of research projects which are more profitable and compromise necessary but not profitable research. | |
| discrimination, including Genetic discrimination | Biobanks should prevent donor communities from facing discrimination as a result of participating in a biobank project | Research reveals private information and release of it may cause participants to face discrimination. What responsibility does the biobank have to mitigate the problem? | |
| discrimination, including Genetic discrimination | Biobanks should prevent donor communities from facing discrimination as a result of participating in a biobank project | Participants may reveal their own information because of participation in a biobank and subsequently face discrimination. What responsibility does the biobank have to mitigate the problem? | |
| informed consent | Donors to biobanks need a consent process adjusted specifically to biobanks. | What breadth of consent should biobanks have? | |
| Institutional review board | It would be nice to have a robust governance system before biobanks are created. | How will a good governance system be designed? | |
| Institutional review board | The oversight institution reviewing biobanks should be independent of the biobank. | Where should checks and balances be? | |
| Institutional review board | An individual organization needs multinational support to do international research. | Who should govern when research spans different countries with different legal and personal rights standards? | |
| Privacy for research participants | Donors should have their specimens sufficiently anonymized. | A specimen by nature includes some data about donors - how much anonymizing is sufficient? | |
| Privacy for research participants | Donors have some right to return of results. | How does one return results to anonymized donors? | |
| Privacy for research participants | Donors have a right to withdraw from research. | Specimens can be destroyed, but to what extent should anonymized data which has already been shared be withdrawn? | |
| Privacy for research participants | Data derived from specimens should be shared. | Who gets access and how much? | |
| Privacy for research participants | Changing technology makes it difficult for researchers to say how safe participant information is. | What protections can be promised? | |
| Return of results | Donors have a right to know the purpose of a biobank and what results it generates | When should all donors share general information and when does each donor have a personal right to personal information? | |
| Public consultation | Everyone wants the researchers and community to work together. | What resources should be spent doing outreach, and how much involvement does the community want, and what role should the community have? | |
| Public consultation | Communities should participate in writing laws, standards, and policies for research. | How can communities be encouraged to participate, who represents the community, and how much involvement should there be? | |
| Public consultation | Patients should be involved when there is research on diseases. | When people are desperate because of a disease, to what extent can they participate fairly without feeling obligation to support research? | |
| Public consultation | Communities which donate specimens to a biobank should have special involvement in their biobank. | What kind of involvement? | |
| Resource sharing | Research efficiency increases greatly when resources are shared. | How should beneficiaries share costs? This is especially problematic when a biobank is a national resource and another country wants access to it. | |
| Resource sharing | Results of studies should go to the widest possible audience. | When should this happen and in what way? Can results be released with commercial licensing for use? | |

== Privacy for research participants ==
There is broad consensus that when a person donates a specimen for research, that person retains a right to privacy thereafter. To uphold this right, researchers strive to balance the need to keep specimens anonymous or de-identified from protected health information with the need to retain access to data about the specimen, enabling researchers to use the sample without knowing the donor's identity . In the United States, for example, the Office for Human Research Protections often promotes a traditional system in which identifying data is coded, and the key to decipher this information is stored separately, which can only be accessed under special circumstances, outside the scope of regular research activities.

Complications arise in many situations, such as when the identity of the donor is released anyway or when the researchers want to contact the donor of the sample. Donor identities could become known if the data and decipher key are insecure, but more likely, with rich datasets the identities of donors could be determined only from a few pieces of information which were thought unrelated to disturbing anonymity before the advent of computer communication.

Among the concerns which participants in biobanks have expressed are giving personal information to researchers and having data used against them somehow.

Scientists have demonstrated that in many cases where participants' names were removed from data, the data still contained enough information to make identification of the participants possible. This is because the historical methods of protecting confidentiality and anonymity have become obsolete when radically more detailed databases became available. Another problem is that even small amounts of genetic data, such as a record of 100 single nucleotide polymorphisms, can uniquely identify anyone.

There have been problems deciding what safeguards should be in place for storing medical research data. In response, some researchers have made efforts to describe what constitutes sufficient security and to recognize what seemingly anonymized information can be used to identify donors.

== Ownership of specimens ==
When a person donates a specimen to a researcher, it is not easy to describe what the participant is donating because ownership of the specimen represents more rights than physical control over the specimen.

The specimens themselves have commercial value, and research products made from specimens can also. Fundamental research benefits all sectors, including government, non-profit, and commercial, and these sectors will not benefit equally. Specimens may be subject to biological patenting or research results from specimen experimentation may lead to the development of products which some entity will own. The extent to which a specimen donor should be able to restrict the way their specimen is used is a matter of debate.

Some researchers make the argument that the specimens and data should be publicly owned. Other researchers say that by calling for donations and branding the process as altruistic the entities organizing biobank research are circumventing difficult ethical questions which participants and researchers ought to address.

== Return of results ==
There is broad consensus that participants in clinical research have a right to know the results of a study in which they participated so that they can check the extent to which their participation delivered beneficial results to their community. The right to justice in the Belmont Report is a part of this idea. Despite the consensus that researchers should return some information to communities, there is no universally recognized authoritative policy on how researchers should return results to communities, and the views and practices of researchers in the field vary widely.

Returning results can be problematic for many reasons, such as increased difficulty of tracking participants who donated a sample as time passes, the conflict with the participant's right to privacy, the inability of researchers to meaningfully explain scientific results to participants, general disinterest of participants to study results, and deciding what constitutes a return of results.

If genetic testing is done, then researches may get health information about participants, but in many cases there is no plan in place for giving participants information derived from their samples.

== Informed consent ==
Because donating a specimen involves consideration of many issues, different people will have different levels of understanding of what they are doing when they donate a specimen. Since it is difficult to explain every issue to everyone, problems of giving informed consent arise when researchers take samples.

A special informed consent problem happened historically with biobanks. Previous to the advent of biobanks, researchers would ask specimen donors for consent to participate in a single study, and give participants information about that study. In a biobank system, a researcher may have many specimens collected over many years and then long after the donors gave the sample, that researcher may want to conduct a new study using those samples but have no good way to give donors information about that study and collect their consent. This problem was first identified in widespread publication in 1995 when an article on this topic was published.

Many people have the opportunity to donate samples to medical research in the course of their regular medical care, but there are ethical problems in having one's own doctor request specimens. Most participants are willing to provide consent for biospecimens and disease specific or related biobanks are favorable. Donors to biobanks frequently do not have a good understanding of the concept of a biobank or the implications of donating a specimen to one. Researchers support biobanking despite risk to participants because the benefit is high, it pays respect to people's wishes to involve themselves in research, current practices and culture support this kind of research, and consensus is that the risk of participation is low.
