= HDC =

HDC may refer to:

== Computing ==
- Hyperdimensional computing, a computer science approach
- Handle of Device Context, part of the GDI API
- High-Definition Coding, an audio codec
- /dev/hdc; a Unix-like ATA device file

== Law ==
- Holder in due course, in commercial law
- Home Detention Curfew, United Kingdom

== Music ==
- Heavyweight Dub Champion, an American electronic group
- Herräng Dance Camp, Sweden

== Organizations ==
- Halal Industry Development Corporation, Malaysia
- Health and Disability Commissioner, New Zealand
- Health Data Consortium, US
- Historic Districts Council, New York City, US
- Honeysuckle Development Corporation, NSW, Australia
- HDC Hyundai Development Company, South Korea

== Transportation ==
- Haldia Dock Complex, of the Port of Kolkata, India
- Hammond Northshore Regional Airport (FAA LID code), Louisiana, US
- High Desert Corridor, proposed high-speed rail line in Southern California, US
- Hill descent control system, of an automobile

== Other uses ==
- Histidine decarboxylase, an enzyme
