= Office of Biorepositories and Biospecimen Research =

The Office of Biorepositories and Biospecimen Research is a division of the United States National Cancer Institute which was formed in 2005 to promote and develop biobank infrastructure.

== History ==
The guidelines which the OBBR published were among the first generation of policies relating to biobank ethics.

== Biospecimen Research Network Symposia ==
The OBBR organizes an annual conference called the "Biospecimen Research Network Symposia".
