= Real-time data =

Information delivered immediately after collection

Real-time data (RTD) is information that is delivered immediately after collection. There is no delay in the timeliness of the information provided. Real-time data is often used for navigation or tracking. Such data is usually processed using real-time computing although it can also be stored for later or off-line data analysis.

Real-time data is not the same as dynamic data. Real-time data can be dynamic (e.g. a variable indicating current location) or static (e.g. a fresh log entry indicating location at a specific time).

== In economics ==
Real-time economic data, and other official statistics, are often based on preliminary estimates, and therefore are frequently adjusted as better estimates become available. These later adjusted data are called "revised data". The terms real-time economic data and real-time economic analysis were coined by Francis X. Diebold and Glenn D. Rudebusch. Macroeconomist Glenn D. Rudebusch defined real-time analysis as 'the use of sequential information sets that were actually available as history unfolded.' Macroeconomist Athanasios Orphanides has argued that economic policy rules may have very different effects when based on error-prone real-time data (as they inevitably are in reality) than they would if policy makers followed the same rules but had more accurate data available.

In order to better understand the accuracy of economic data and its effects on economic decisions, some economic organizations, such as the Federal Reserve Bank of St. Louis, Federal Reserve Bank of Philadelphia and the Euro-Area Business Cycle Network (EABCN), have made databases available that contain both real-time data and subsequent revised estimates of the same data.

== In auctions ==
Real-time bidding is programmatic real-time auctions that sell digital-ad impressions. Entities on both the buying and selling sides require almost instantaneous access to data in order to make decisions, forcing real-time data to the forefront of their needs. To support these needs, new strategies and technologies, such Druid have arisen and are quickly evolving.

== See also ==
- Datafication
- Data mining
- Geographic information system
- Information privacy
- Management information system
- Online analytical processing
- Personal data service
- Personal Information Agent
- Real-time business intelligence
- Social information processing
- User activity monitoring
