= Honest broker =

An honest broker is an entity that keeps sets of private information but distributes parts of those sets to other entities who should not have access to the entire set. Honest brokers often work in clinical research with biological specimens; in that case, donors of specimens allow researchers to do research on those specimens, but typically want their specimen de-identified by having protected health information separated from it. The honest broker would keep both the specimen and associated protected health information, but only allow researchers to have access to the specimen without the protected health information.

== Characteristics ==
Honest brokers are typically appointed to a research project by an institutional review board. They provide data from clinical and research sources for research use only and in accordance with policies that prohibit re-identification.

Organizations conducting breast cancer research have identified access to biological specimens as a top priority, and therefore honest broker systems are key to research because they increase access to specimens.

== Diplomacy ==
In diplomacy an "honest broker" is an entity (individual or organisation) that is accepted by all sides in a negotiation as impartial. Neutrality does not equal an absence of interest; rather, the interest of the honest broker lies in a solution, without preference for either party involved in the conflict.

German Chancellor Otto von Bismarck was the first to use the term (applied to himself) in connection with the 1878 Congress of Berlin.
