= Lungscape =

Lungscape is a translational research program designed, implemented and conducted by the European Thoracic Oncology Platform (ETOP) in collaboration with a series of leading hospitals and clinics across Europe and beyond.

== Aim ==
The Lungscape program aims to address the challenges of studying the molecular epidemiology of lung cancer and to expedite the knowledge of current and evolving clinical and molecular biomarkers.

Lungscape comprises the coordination and harmonization of the procedures within a group of lung cancer specialists, in order to allow the analysis of larger series of cases. The international collaborative effort provides a platform for molecular correlative studies and thus creates a basis for the development of clinical trials of novel therapeutics.

== Design ==
The basis of Lungscape is a decentralized biobank with fully annotated tissue samples from resected stage I - III non-small-cell lung carcinoma (NSCLC). An electronic database (termed iBiobank) is used to store the anonymized comprehensive molecular and clinical data and tracking biological material and derivatives thereof. Participating centers use a secure web-based application to enter data into this central database. The virtual nature of iBiobank and the introduction of stringent standardized biomolecular assessments, a so-called external quality assurance (EQA) process to establish laboratory performance levels [5], remove the need of transferring samples to a central location for evaluation. The system captures detailed parameters like tumor stage, grade, histological subtype, precise surgical procedure as well as patient characteristics.

Schematic illustration of the ETOP Lungscape project

== Master protocol and subprojects ==
The Lungscape master protocol defines the setting in which specific hypotheses will be investigated. It describes the mode of cooperation of the participating investigators, the selection of documentation of the NSCLC cohort, laboratory requirements as well as the regulatory framework. Specific protocol modules (subprojects) then formulate a hypothesis to be investigated in the framework of Lungscape.
