= Identity score =

An identity score is a system for detecting identity theft. Identity scores are increasingly being adopted as a means to prevent fraud in business and as a tool to verify and correct public records.

Identity scores incorporate, a broad set of consumer data that gauges a person's legitimacy. Identity score components can include (but are not limited to) personal identifiers, public records, Internet data, government records, corporate data, predicted behavior patterns based on empirical data, self-assessed behavior patterns, and credit records.

== Business and consumer identity scores ==
Identity scoring was originally developed for use by financial services firms to measure the fraud risk for new customers opening accounts. Typical external credit and fraud checks often fail to detect erroneous background information.

Identity scoring is also being tested as a means for financial institutions to comply with criminal investigations and antiterrorism measures, such as the Bank Secrecy Act (BSA) and the USA PATRIOT Act. Usage of fraud verification tools and third-party authentication systems to verify identities and “red flag” suspicious activity is greatly enhanced by identity scoring.

== Public records, private records, and credit records ==
Identity scores are built from collecting information from a variety of sources and analyzing discernible patterns from the total information. These records can generally be broken down into three categories: Public records, private records, and credit records.

Public records can include (but are not limited to) any of the following sources:

- Federal, state and local government records
- Financial records like bankruptcies, liens and judgments
- Property ownership records
- Registered Voter Records
- Law enforcement records for felony and misdemeanor convictions

Private (non-credit) records can include (but are not limited to) any of the following sources:

- Bill and utility payments
- Collected personal information from marketers or affiliates
- Information provided to subscription-based Internet services
- Billing information from medical services
- Private background checks conducted by human resource departments

Private (credit) records can include (but are not limited to) any of the following sources:

- Information submitted to any or all credit bureaus or credit reporting agencies (Equifax, Experian, Trans Union, Innovis, etc.)
- “Auto insurance” underwriting scores generated from credit records

== Components ==
Each identity scoring system uses individual data components to generate their score, meaning that results can vary wildly even for the same individual.

Typical identity score components can include (but are not limited to):

- Name components

Personally identifying information such as name, address, etc.

- Behavioral use pattern components

Analyzed patterns of behavior from information.

- Internet components

Personally identifying information found on the Internet, such as Web sites, blogs, chat rooms, etc.

- Hacker and fraud components

Personally identifying information that has been stolen in data breaches and may be used in recognizable patterns of fraud, such as unexplained credit card purchases

- Synthetic identity components

Personally identifying information that is being used to create a new false (“synthetic”) identity.

== Predictive analytics ==
Identity scores are sometimes calculated using predictive analytics, the science of taking behavioral data and comparing it against historical patterns to identify potentially risky or fraudulent activity.

By compiling publicly available information and using predictive analytics to gauge the patterns of how the information is used, identity scoring systems can measure the authenticity of a particular identity.

== Usage ==
Identity scoring can be used in a variety of ways, from identity verification and measuring fraud risk on the enterprise level, to preventing fraudulent use of identities and synthetic identity theft on the consumer level. Identity scoring can theoretically provide much more definitive proof of an identity's legitimacy, because of the amount of identifying data it utilizes. Virtually all public information about an individual can be used as data in their identity score.

=== Credit scores ===
Credit scores are compiled from information sources relating to credit, such as number of credit accounts held, balances on each account, dates of collection activity, and so on. Credit scores do not measure any financial or personal activity that is not related to credit, and identity fraud that does not involve credit will not appear on credit reports or affect credit scores.

Identity scores are compiled from much larger sources of information, including criminal records, property records, and so on. Identity scoring enables “grading” of patterns of behavior via predictive analytics, from which an identity monitoring service can track an individual's or criminal group's activity across several enterprises, instead of being confined to monitoring just one area.

Identity scores are also much more mutable and “fuzzy” than credit scores, because the source information—public records and personally identifying information—is constantly changing. Every time an individual changes a job, buys or sells property, or has an encounter with law enforcement, this person's public records are altered. Coordinating the information across so many different sources makes it very difficult to fix errors in one's information once they occur.

Where credit scores have a generally accepted model of a three-digit-number (used for the FICO score, the new VantageScore, and credit bureaus' proprietary scores), identity scoring models vary wildly from product to product.

=== Identity theft ===
Identity scoring works by matching the information the user provides against billions of records in public databases, ranging from property and tax records to Internet search engines, and calculating it against patterns designed to recognize fraud or identity theft.

Example: John's name and Social Security number were stolen by identity thieves who hacked a stolen laptop. They take her Social Security number and combine it with another stolen name, and use it to open a series of new accounts, including credit cards and retail gift cards. An identity protection system that used identity scoring would alert Wendy that her Social Security number had been compromised.

Because identity scores include much more accurate information and can predict behavior patterns more definitively than credit scores, the Gartner research firm predicted that identity scoring will surpass credit monitoring as the leading identity theft prevention measure by 2009. However, Gartner research analyst Avivah Litan warned that identity scoring was not a foolproof system, as it still relied on the underlying accuracy of the information used.

=== Breeder documents ===
There are three types of breeder documents, which are documents designed to verify other identification documents.

- Civil : Birth, death, marriage certificates, and registered partnership certificates
- Business: Legal status of a company
- Other: Real estate, residence, etc.

Reliance on these documents to verify identities is flawed, as there is no standardized means to verify that information contained in breeder documents is legitimate. Identity scoring can be used as a tool to authenticate identities on an independent level in cases of employment hiring and information verification.

Currently there is no standard means to verify that information provided on an I-9 work document is legitimate, for example. The desire for industries to quickly hire cheap labor trumps any incentive a business has to check the credentials of their new hires, leading to a “gray market” for stolen identities and contributing to continuing surges in illegal immigration. Tools that employ identity scoring to verify that a person's name and Social Security number match, or that their I-9 data is correct, could cut down on the sale and misuse of personal information while enabling better enforcement of immigration law.

=== Business ===
The following companies make use of identity scoring products or systems in their businesses:

- Experian

Experian’s Fraud Shield product cross-references from their 215-million-entry consumer credit database, and provides risk management and identity verification services from subscriber businesses, as well as an additional score product that combines information from both credit and fraud-related sources.

- Fair Isaac

Fair Isaac introduced the Falcon ID scoring solution in August 2004. Falcon ID uses predictive analytics in its fraud verification process, and enables cross-business information sharing, a benefit Fair Isaac touted as “very good news for businesses in many industries that are working to protect their customers from identity fraud, and very bad news for their common enemy, the perpetrators of ID fraud.”

- MyPublicInfo

An identity protection company based in Arlington, VA, MyPublicInfo uses identity scoring as a base for several of its products. The company has announced plans for other consumer identity scoring products in 2007, but has not provided details.
