= Medical advice =

Medical advice is the provision of a formal professional opinion regarding what a specific individual should or should not do to restore or preserve health. Typically, medical advice involves giving a diagnosis and/or prescribing a treatment for medical condition. Medical advice is not the same as personal advice even if the advice concerns medical care.

== Doctor–patient relationship ==
In industrializd countries, medical advice is given in the context of a doctor–patient relationship. A licensed health care professional can be held legally liable for the advice he or she gives to a patient. Giving bad advice may be considered medical malpractice under specified circumstances.

The doctor–patient relationship is one factor in determining the patient's compliance with medical advice. Patients adhere more closely to medical advice when the healthcare provider is friendly, doesn't interrupt the patient, or has good verbal communication skills. Patients are less likely to comply with medical advice if the advice is not what the patients expected, if the patients do not agree with the proposed treatment, if the patient is not confident in the provider's competence, or if the patient cannot understand what the provider says due to language barriers or overuse of medical jargon. Patients are also less likely to comply with medical advice if the healthcare provider seems disrespectful of the patient or appears to hold negative stereotypes of the patients' race, class, or other characteristics.

== Difference to medical information ==
Medical advice can be distinguished from medical information, which is the relation of facts.

Medical information pertaining to an individual is called protected health information.

Discussing medical information is considered a fundamental free speech right and is not considered medical advice.

== See also ==
- Physician
- Against medical advice
- Duty of care
- Standard of care
- Scope of practice
- Medical direction
- Legal advice
