= Return of results =

Return of results is a concept in research ethics which describes the extent of the duty of a researcher to reveal and explain the results of research to a research participant.

Return of results is particularly discussed in the field of biobanks, where a typical case would be that many members of a community donate biobank specimens for medical research. In the course of the research, especially in human genomics research, scientists may discover personal health information which could influence the behavior of specimen donors if they had this information. For different cases, there are arguments for and against revealing study information to participants and in many cases the morally correct choice is not self-evident.

== Example situation ==
The following example shows some possible outcomes of trying to fulfill the return of results in genomic research.

A healthy person donates a biological specimen and agrees to have that specimen and associated data put into a genome-wide association study. The goal of the study would be something unrelated to the donor's identified interests, and may be, for example, to build the base of fundamental research or to study rare disease.

The sample is stored for years. Later a researcher gets access to data from the sample, and this data has been de-identified so that the researcher can use the data without invading the research participant's privacy. This researcher finds that the donor's specimen displays biomarkers which indicate that the person is at risk for developing a genetic disease. If an individual's personal physician had this genetic information, the standard of care might be to take action. One outcome of this scenario could be that the researcher contacts the specimen donor, gives this information, and the donor is more informed and happy for this.

Another outcome of this situation is that the researcher may not be a medical doctor, and in any case, it is not usual for a person to receive a diagnosis outside of a doctor-patient relationship. Even if the participant understands that the information is not a diagnosis, it can be confusing to know what to do when getting health information from an unknown person. Even if the researcher ought to tell the specimen donor about this development, it may not be the case that the researcher has the means to contact the participant because time has passed since the sample was collected and the means of contacting the participant may be unknown because there are research protections in place to prevent researchers from knowing the identity of the donor for the donor's own sake and right to privacy. The donor, for whatever reason, may not even want to know about a genetic problem, and may find the information unwelcome if tracked and informed. In addition to these stated problems, other problems can arise.

== Return of individual results ==
There is debate as to whether researchers should give participants in research studies individual results based on their contribution to the study. Some perspectives say that researchers should give individuals all information while others say that researchers generally should not offer this.

=== Arguments in favor ===
Proponents of offering individual results most often cite "respect for persons" as the ethical basis for this practice. The following reasons support this argument: some studies have shown that participants want such results; returning results is a way of demonstrating respect to for donors' contributions to research; research results, and especially genetic data, can be valuable information for individuals; and when participants have access to more information about themselves it increases their personal autonomy. Aside from medical health, having access to information may have social meaning to participants such as solidifying a cultural identity, membership in an ethnic group, or identifying a non-paternity event.

=== Arguments against ===
The definition of research is a major argument against offering research results. Research is not treatment and guidelines including the Belmont Report distinguish between "clinical practice" which has the goal of improving an individual's health and "research" which has the goal of developing general knowledge.

Researchers must take care to not allow participants to be confused as to whether they are participating in research or receiving personal clinical care; a researcher is not a study participant's personal health advisor. Study participants often have a tendency to perceive researchers as their physicians and research as personal treatment designed to benefit them. When participants get information from researchers they may interpret it as health advice.

The nature of the results is problematic as well. Research data is often not comprehensible to participants and no one would want them to take health action based on unsubstantiated misinterpretations of the data.

== Alternate uses of term ==
"Return of results" usually refers to the return of study data of personal or community interest to participants. Research may result in other products besides data, such as the development of commercially valuable product which was a research goal. When the term "return of results" is used, it usually does not refer to the return of results of research (such as profit generated) other than an explanation of what the research showed. The debate about non-informational study results being returned is discussed as "ownership of results" or under other headings.

== Issues relating to return of results ==
There is no universally recognized authoritative policy on whether or how researchers should return results to research participants, and the views and practices of researchers in the field vary widely.

== Research ==
In September 2011 the National Human Genome Research Institute awarded grants totaling US$5.7 million to study ethics relating to the return of results.
