= Penn Medicine BioBank =

Medical academic biobank

The Penn Medicine BioBank (PMBB) is a medical academic biobank located in Philadelphia, Pennsylvania, United States at the University of Pennsylvania (Penn Medicine), founded in 2008. The Penn Medicine BioBank integrates health-related data—including diagnosis codes, lab measurements, imaging data, and lifestyle factors—with genomic and biomarker information to facilitate research and translational science. The PMBB has contributed to several studies on disease prevention, treatment efficacy, and public health research, and provides researchers with comprehensive health data and biospecimens.

It has enrolled over 260,000 participants, with about 30% identifying as non-European ancestry. Participants contribute an average of seven years of electronic health record data and consent to recontact for further studies.
