= Biobank =

Repository of biological samples used for research

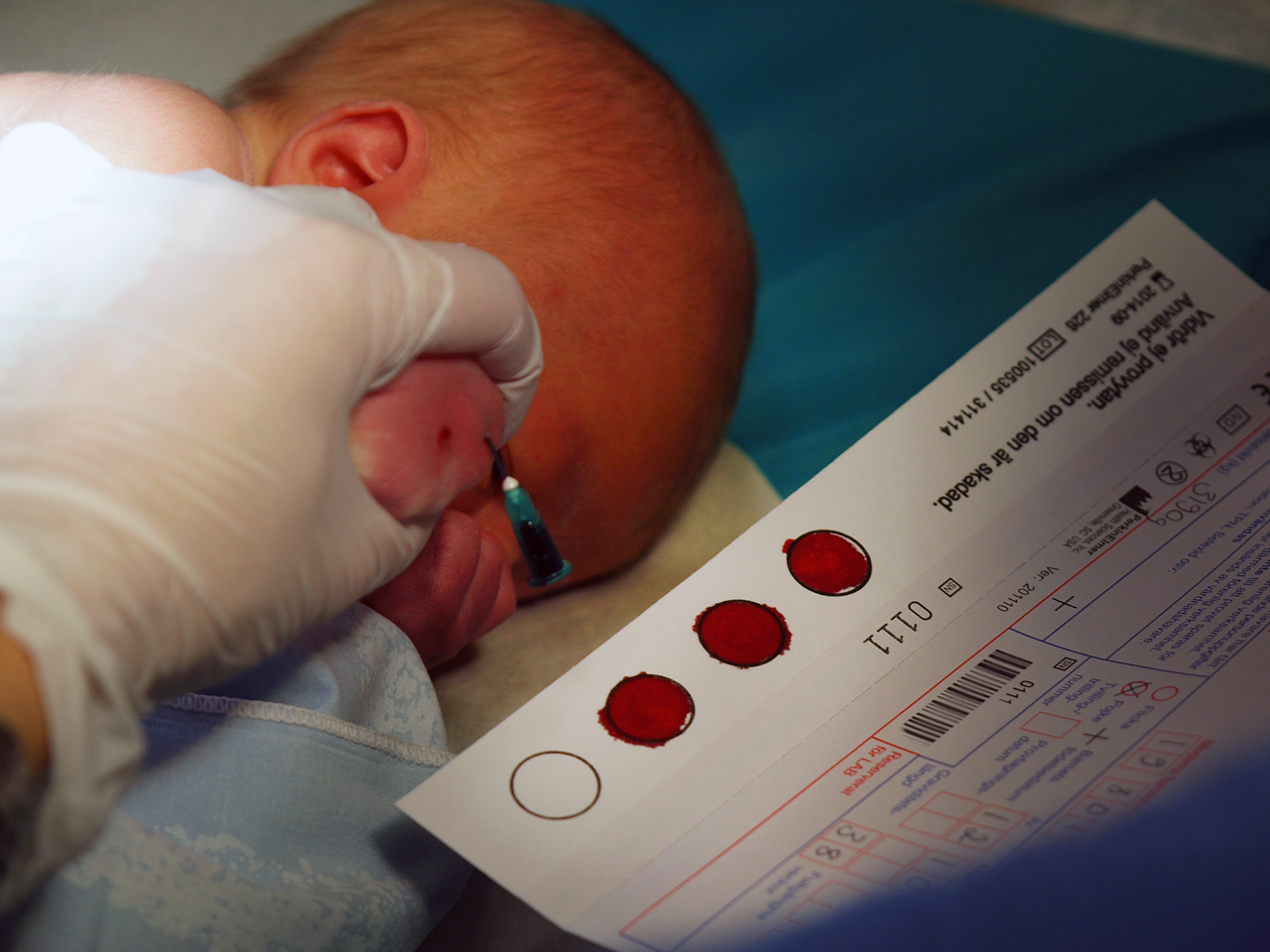
Blood samples are collected from a newborn baby in Sweden for the national PKU registry biobank.

A biobank is a type of biorepository that stores biological specimens (usually human) for use in research. Biobanks have become an important resource in medical research, supporting many types of contemporary research like genomics and personalized medicine.

Biobanks can give researchers access to data representing a large number of people. Samples in biobanks and the data derived from those samples can often be used by multiple researchers for cross purpose research studies. For example, many diseases are associated with single-nucleotide polymorphisms. Genome-wide association studies using data from tens or hundreds of thousands of individuals can identify these genetic associations as potential disease biomarkers. Many researchers struggled to acquire sufficient samples prior to the advent of biobanks.

Biobanks have provoked questions on privacy, research ethics, and medical ethics. Viewpoints on what constitutes appropriate biobank ethics diverge. However, a consensus has been reached that operating biobanks without establishing carefully considered governing principles and policies could be detrimental to communities that participate in biobank programs.

== Background ==
The term "biobank" first appeared in the late 1990s and is a broad term that has evolved in recent years. One definition is "an organized collection of human biological material and associated information stored for one or more research purposes." Collections of plant, animal, microbe, and other nonhuman materials may also be described as biobanks but in some discussions the term is reserved for human specimens.

Biobanks usually incorporate cryogenic storage facilities for the samples. They may range in size from individual refrigerators to warehouses, and are maintained by institutions such as hospitals, universities, nonprofit organizations, and pharmaceutical companies.

Biobanks may be classified by purpose or design. Disease-oriented biobanks usually have a hospital affiliation through which they collect samples representing a variety of diseases, perhaps to look for biomarkers affiliated with disease. Population-based biobanks need no particular hospital affiliation because they take samples from large numbers of all kinds of people, perhaps to look for biomarkers for disease susceptibility in a general population.

- Virtual biobanks integrate epidemiological cohorts into a common pool. Virtual biobanks allow for sample collection to meet national regulations.
- Tissue banks harvest and store human tissues for transplantation and research. As biobanks become more established, it is expected that tissue banks will merge with biobanks.
- Organ bank is a proposed type of biobank that would store whole organs, usually cryopreserved, with intention to be used for transplantation after identifying a matching patient. It is hypothesized that cryopreserved organs could stay viable in organ banks for years, instead of mere hours.
- Population banks store biomaterial as well as associated characteristics such as lifestyle, clinical, and environmental data.

In 2008, United States researchers stored 270 million specimens in biobanks, and the rate of new sample collection was 20 million per year. These numbers represent a fundamental worldwide change in the nature of research between the time when such numbers of samples could not be used and the time when researchers began demanding them. Collectively, researchers began to progress beyond single-center research centers to a next-generation qualitatively different research infrastructure. Some of the challenges raised by the advent of biobanks are ethical, legal, and social issues pertaining to their existence, including the fairness of collecting donations from vulnerable populations, providing informed consent to donors, the logistics of data disclosure to participants, the right to ownership of intellectual property, and the privacy and security of donors who participate. Because of these new problems, researchers and policymakers began to require new systems of research governance.

Many researchers have identified biobanking as a key area for infrastructure development in order to promote drug discovery and drug development.

== Types and applications ==
=== Human genetics research ===
By the late 1990s, scientists realized that although many diseases are caused at least in part by a genetic component, few diseases originate from a single defective gene; most genetic diseases are caused by multiple genetic factors on multiple genes. Because the strategy of looking only at single genes was ineffective for finding the genetic components of many diseases, and because new technology made the cost of examining a single gene versus doing a genome-wide scan about the same, scientists began collecting much larger amounts of genetic information when any was to be collected at all. At the same time technological advances also made it possible for wide sharing of information, so when data was collected, many scientists doing genetics work found that access to data from genome-wide scans collected for any one reason would actually be useful in many other types of genetic research. Whereas before data usually stayed in one laboratory, now scientists began to store large amounts of genetic data in single places for community use and sharing.

An immediate result of doing genome-wide scans and sharing data was the discovery of many single-nucleotide polymorphisms, with an early success being an improvement from the identification of about 10,000 of these with single-gene scanning and before biobanks versus 500,000 by 2007 after the genome-wide scanning practice had been in place for some years. A problem remained; this changing practice allowed the collection of genotype data, but it did not simultaneously come with a system to gather the related phenotype data. Whereas genotype data comes from a biological specimen like a blood sample, phenotype data has to come from examining a specimen donor with an interview, physical assessment, review of medical history, or some other process which could be difficult to arrange. Even when this data was available, there were ethical uncertainties about the extent to which and the ways in which patient rights could be preserved by connecting it to genotypic data. The institution of the biobank began to be developed to store genotypic data, associate it with phenotypic data, and make it more widely available to researchers who needed it.

Biobanks including genetic testing samples have historically been composed of a majority of samples from individuals from European ancestry. Diversification of biobank samples is needed and researchers should consider the factors effecting the underrepresented populations.

=== Conservation, ecosystem restoration and geoengineering ===
In November 2020 scientists began collecting living fragments, tissue and DNA samples of the endangered corals from the Great Barrier Reef for a precautionary biobank for potential future restoration and rehabilitation activities. A few months earlier another Australian team of researchers reported that they evolved such corals to be more heat-resistant.

== Biological specimens ==
The specimens stored by a biobank and made available to researchers are taken by sampling. Specimen types include blood, urine, skin cells, organ tissue, and other materials. Increasingly, methods for sampling tissue specimens are becoming more targeted, sometimes involving the use of MRI to determine which specific areas of tissue should be sampled. The biobank keeps these specimens in good condition until a researcher needs them to conduct a test, do an experiment, or perform an analysis.

=== Storage ===
Biobanks, like other DNA databases, must carefully store and document access to samples and donor information. The samples must be maintained reliably with minimal deterioration over time, and they must be protected from physical damage, both accidental and intentional. The registration of each sample entering and exiting the system is centrally stored, usually on a computer-based system that can be backed up frequently. The physical location of each sample is noted to allow the rapid location of specimens. Archival systems de-identify samples to respect the privacy of donors and allow blinding of researchers to analysis. The database, including clinical data, is kept separately with a secure method to link clinical information to tissue samples. Room temperature storage of samples is sometimes used, and was developed in response to perceived disadvantages of low-temperature storage, such as costs and potential for freezer failure. Current systems are small and are capable of storing nearly 40,000 samples in about one tenth of the space required by a −80 °C (−112 °F) freezer. Replicates or split samples are often stored in separate locations for security.

=== Ownership ===
One controversy of large databases of genetic material is the question of ownership of samples. As of 2007, Iceland had three different laws on ownership of the physical samples and the information they contain. Icelandic law holds that the Icelandic government has custodial rights of the physical samples themselves while the donors retain ownership rights. In contrast, Tonga and Estonia give ownership of biobank samples to the government, but their laws include strong protections of donor rights.

== Ethics ==
The key event which arises in biobanking is when a researcher wants to collect a human specimen for research. When this happens, some issues which arise include the following: right to privacy for research participants, ownership of the specimen and its derived data, the extent to which the donor can share in the return of the research results, and the extent to which a donor is able to consent to be in a research study.

With respect to consent, the main issue is that biobanks usually collect samples and data for multiple future research purposes and it is not feasible to obtain specific consent for all possible future research. It has been discussed that one-off consent or a broad consent for various research purposes may not suffice ethical and legal requirements. Dynamic consent is an approach to consent that may be better suited to biobanking, because it enables ongoing engagement and communication between the researchers and sample/data donors over time.

== Governance ==
There is no internationally accepted set of governance guidelines that are designed to work with biobanks. Biobanks typically try to adapt to the broader recommendations that are internationally accepted for human subject research and change guidelines as they become updated. For many types of research and particularly medical research, oversight comes at the local level from an institutional review board. Institutional review boards typically enforce standards set by their country's government. To different extents, the law used by different countries is often modeled on biobank governance recommendations that have been internationally proposed.

=== Key organizations ===
Some examples of organizations that participated in creating written biobanking guidelines are the following: World Medical Association, Council for International Organizations of Medical Sciences, Council of Europe, Human Genome Organisation, World Health Organization, and UNESCO. The International Society for Biological and Environmental Repositories (ISBER) is a global biobanking organization which creates opportunities for networking, education, and innovations and harmonizes approaches to evolving challenges in biological and environmental repositories. ISBER connects repositories globally through best practices. The ISBER Best Practices, Fourth Edition was launched on January 31, 2018 with a LN2 addendum that was launched early May 2019.

=== History ===
In 1998, the Icelandic Parliament passed the Act on Health Sector Database. This act allowed for the creation of a national biobank in that country. In 1999, the United States National Bioethics Advisory Commission issued a report containing policy recommendations about handling human biological specimens. In 2005, the United States National Cancer Institute founded the Office of Biorepositories and Biospecimen Research so that it could have a division to establish a common database and standard operating procedures for its partner organizations with biospecimen collections. In 2006, the Council of the European Union adopted a policy on human biological specimens, which was novel for discussing issues unique to biobanks.

=== Economics ===
Researchers have called for a greater critical examination of the economic aspects of Biobanks, particularly those facilitated by the state. National biobanks are often funded by public/private partnerships, with finance provided by any combination of national research councils, medical charities, pharmaceutical company investment, and biotech venture capital. In this way, national biobanks enable an economic relationship mediated between states, national populations, and commercial entities. It has been illustrated that there is a strong commercial incentive underlying the systematic collection of tissue material. This can be seen particularly in the field of genomic research where population sized study lends itself more easily toward diagnostic technologies rather than basic etiological studies. Considering the potential for substantial profit, researchers Robert Mitchell and Catherine Waldby argue that because biobanks enroll large numbers of the national population as productive participants, who allow their bodies and prospective medical histories to create a resource with commercial potential, their contribution should be seen as a form of "clinical labor" and therefore participants should also benefit economically.

=== Legal cases ===
There have been cases when the ownership of stored human specimens have been disputed and taken to court. Some cases include:

- Moore v. Regents of the University of California
- Greenberg v. Miami Children's Hospital Research Institute

== See also ==
- Biorepository
- Biological database
- Gene bank
- Genetic fingerprinting
- Genomics
- Genotype
- Penn Medicine BioBank
