= Personal identifier =

Personal Identifiers (PID) are a subset of personally identifiable information (PII) data elements, which identify an individual and can permit another person to "assume" that individual's identity without their knowledge or consent. PIIs include direct identifiers (name, social security number) and indirect identifiers (race, ethnicity, age).

Identifiers can be sensitive and non-sensitive, depending on whether it is a direct identifier that is uniquely associated with a person or a quasi-identifier that is not unique. A quasi-identifier cannot pin down an individual alone - it has to be combined with other identifiers.

== Examples of PID ==
=== Privately issued ID credentials ===
- Benefit plan participation number
- Private health care authorization, access, or identification number

=== Transactional financial account numbers ===
- Bank account number
- Credit or debit card account number
- Personal identification number (PIN)
- taxpayer identification number

=== Biometric identifiers ===
- Fingerprint or voiceprint
- Iris or retina scans
- DNA

=== Health or medical information ===
- National Health certificate number

=== Electronic identification credentials ===
- Digital certificates
- Passwords

=== Full Date of Birth ===
- Month, day and year

=== European-defined sensitive data ===
Treated as PID globally, not just for citizens of the EU

- Racial or ethnic origin
- Political opinions
- Religious or philosophical beliefs
- Trade-union membership
- Health or sex life
- Offenses, criminal convictions, or security measures
- Proceedings from crimes or offenses

== See also ==
- National identification number
- Identity score
