= Virtual biobank =

Online database providing biobank data

A virtual biobank is a virtual repository which provides data extracted from and characterizing samples stored at classical biobanks. Virtual biobanks are large databases and can provide high-resolution images of samples as well as other characteristic data. These virtual biobanks can be accessed via specialized software or web portals. Samples are stored in a decentralized manner.

The use of virtual biobanks provides access, in the form of pre-collected data, without requiring access to the physical sample. This allows the sample's data to be more readily shared without fear of contaminating/destroying/transporting the sample.

Virtual biobanks are often used in bioinformatics.

== List of virtual biobanks ==
- UK Prostate Cancer Sample Collection Database - The first virtual biobank dedicated to prostate cancer research was launched on November 7, 2010 by the National Cancer Research Institute and contains information on over 10,000 biological samples taken from men in the UK.
