= Pierangela Samarati =

Italian computer scientist

Pierangela Samarati from the Università degli Studi di Milano, Italy, was named Fellow of the Institute of Electrical and Electronics Engineers (IEEE) in 2012 for contributions to information security, data protection, and privacy. She was named a 2021 ACM Fellow "for contributions to data security and privacy". She was elected to the Academia Europaea in 2023.
