= Greenberg v. Miami Children's Hospital Research Institute =

Florida court case

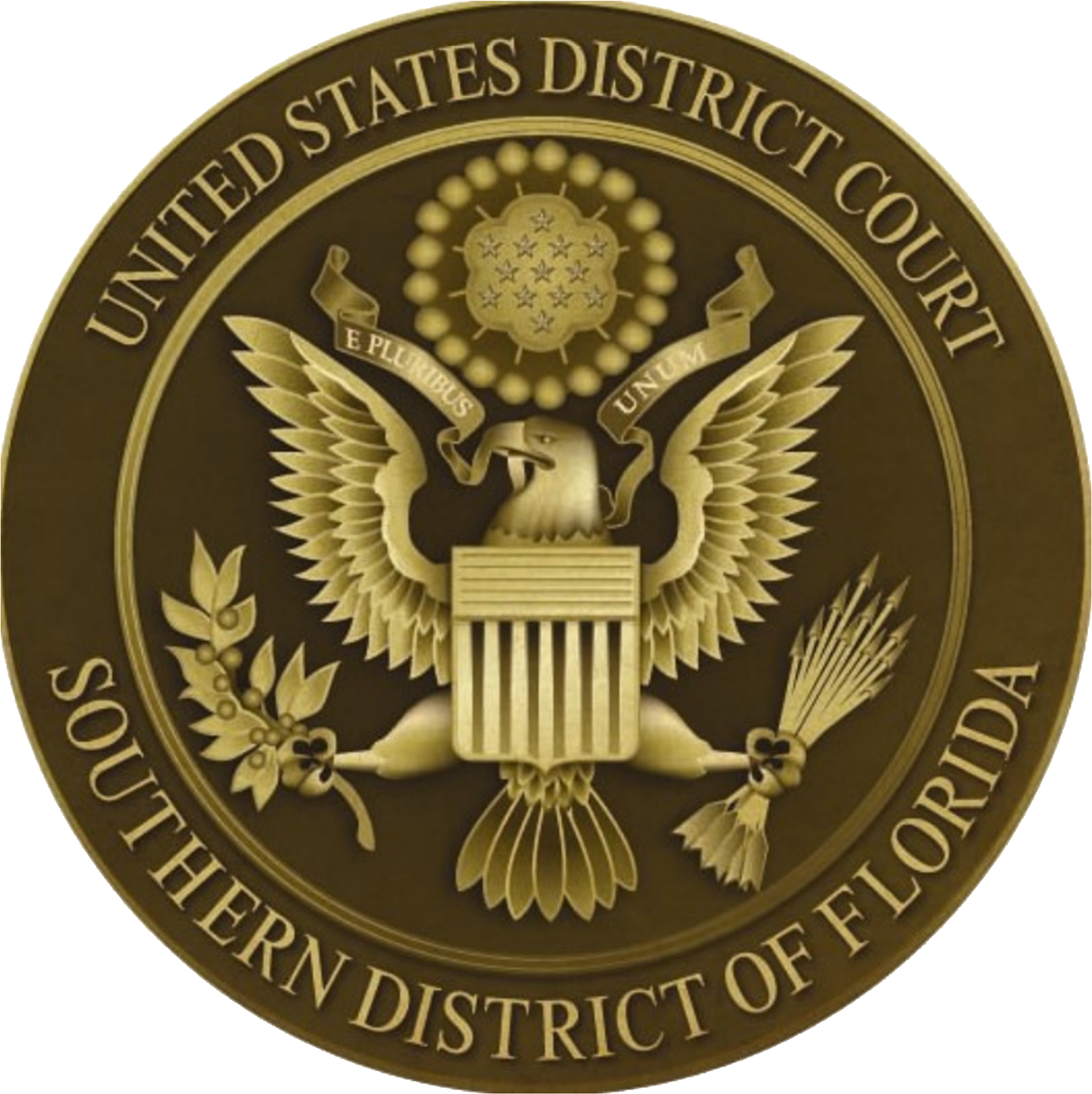
- Court: United States District Court for the Southern District of Florida
- Full case name: Daniel Greenberg, Fern Kupfer, Frieda Eisen, David Green, Canavan Foundation, Dor Yeshorim, and National Tay-Sachs and Allied Diseases Association, Inc. v. Miami Children's Hospital Research Institute, Inc., Variety Children's Hospital, Inc. d/b/a Miami Children's Hospital, and Reuben Matalon
- Decided: May 29, 2003
- Docket nos.: 02-cv-22244
- Citation: 264 F. Supp. 2d 1064

Court membership
- Judge sitting: Federico A. Moreno

Greenberg v. Miami Children's Hospital Research Institute, 264 F. Supp. 2d 1064 (S.D. Fla. 2003), was a decision by the United States District Court for the Southern District of Florida which ruled that individuals do not own their tissue samples when researchers take them for testing.

== History ==
The plaintiffs in this case were a group of parents of children who had Canavan disease and three non-profit organizations who developed a confidential Canavan disease registry and database. The parents provided their children's tissue for research on the disease and the non-profit groups aided in the identification of other affected families. The defendant was Reuben Matalon, who received these tissue samples and used them to isolate and patent the Canavan gene sequence. He subsequently developed a genetic screening test for it and began claiming royalties whenever the test was used. The Miami facilities where he did his research, including Miami Children's Hospital, were also defendants.

== Decision ==
The court dismissed the plaintiffs' claims that the defendants did not provide informed consent, conducted a breach of fiduciary duties, concealed the patent, and misappropriated trade secrets. The court did uphold the plaintiffs' claim of unjust enrichment at the expense of the donors of tissue, writing that "the facts paint a picture of a continuing research collaboration that involved plaintiffs also investing time and significant resources."

== Significance ==
The case set a precedent for determining ownership of donated tissue samples.
