= Tore Dalenius =

Swedish statistician

Tore Dalenius (1917-2002) was an employee of Statistics Sweden. Much of his early work was published in the Swedish language journal Statistisk Tidskrift, the predecessor to today’s Journal of Official Statistics. In 1977, he proposed a formal methodology for statistical disclosure control, which later influenced the development of the concepts such as k-anonymity and Differential Privacy.

Dalenius earned his PhD from Uppsala University in 1957. His advisor was Herman Wold.
