= Unicity (philosophy) =

The principle of unicity explains that each event, each living being, each object, each person or each circumstance has the characteristic of its uniqueness, of its particularity. Other similar events, living beings, objects, persons or circumstances may exist, but never the same entity.

The theory of quantum mechanics (QM) suggests that the principle of unicity is invalid. In other words, no physical system, physical process, or object has a unique and complete description. Instead, QM, the most successfully tested and proven theoretical framework, stipulates that all physical reality can be described in multiple alternative, incompatible ways, using independent descriptions that cannot be contrasted, compared, or combined.

The principle of unicity implies that every conceivable property of a particular physical system will be either true or false, as observable experiments can either confirm or reject the property, as implied by the unique and exhaustive property description assumption. In effect, unicity implies the existence of a universal truth functional, which is incompatible with a quantum Hilbert space of dimension greater than two, in particular Minkowski spacetime is four dimensional space. Therefore, unicity is not part of quantum reality. For each physical object, the intrinsic incompatibility of its (stochastic) quantum descriptions prevents them from being combined into a more precise (deterministic) descriptions, which makes it impossible to create a unique and exhaustive description.
