= Personal Information Agent =

A Personal Information Agent (PIA) is an individual, business, or organization who is expressly authorized by another identifiable individual in dealings with third persons, businesses or organizations concerning personally identifiable information (PII). PIA status allows access to information pertaining to an identifiable individual and the records and associated files of that identifiable individual. This normally includes, but is not limited to, financial files, correspondence, memorandum, machine-readable records and any other documentary material, regardless of physical form or characteristics. Access of these records extends to any copy of any of those things, pertaining to that identifiable individual and including the right to audit and monitor activities that involve the process for notification and reporting of unauthorized disclosure or PII breaches.

== See also ==
- Privacy law
- Privacy Act of 1974 (US)
- Electronic Communications Privacy Act (US)
- Data Protection Directive (EU)
- Data Protection Act 1998 (UK)
- Identity theft
