= Latanya Sweeney =

Computer scientist

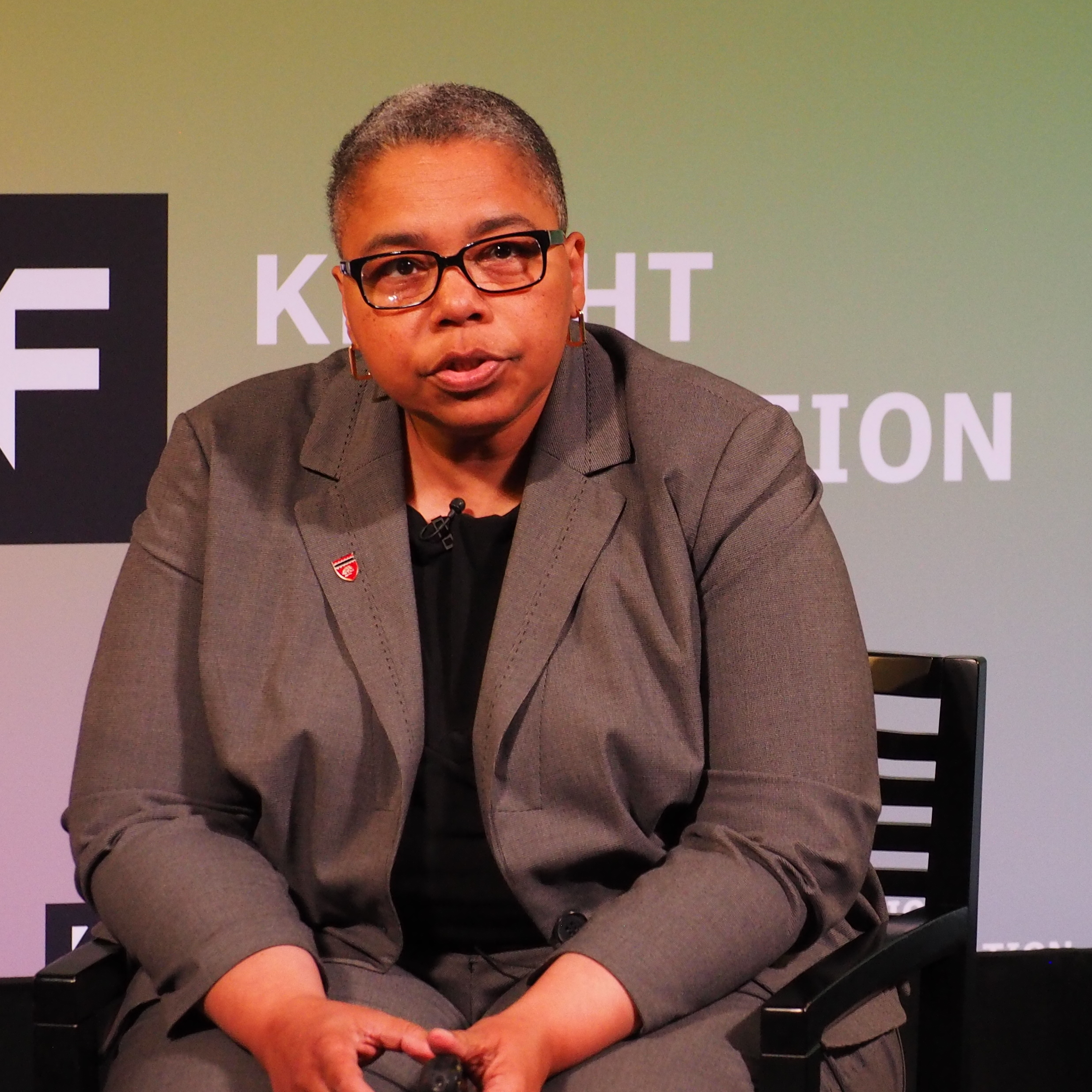
- Sweeney at a panel discussion in New York City, November 2017
- Education: Harvard University (ALB); Massachusetts Institute of Technology (SM, PhD)
- Known for: k-anonymity
- Scientific career
- Fields: Computer Scientist; Science communication
- Workplaces: Harvard University; Carnegie Mellon University
- Thesis: Computational Disclosure Control: Theory and Practice (2001)
- Website: latanyasweeney.org

Latanya Sweeney is an American computer scientist. She is the Daniel Paul Professor of the Practice of Government and Technology at the Harvard Kennedy School and in the Harvard Faculty of Arts and Sciences at Harvard University. She is the founder and director of the Public Interest Tech Lab, founded in 2021 with a $3 million grant from the Ford Foundation as well as the Data Privacy Lab. She is the current Faculty Dean in Currier House at Harvard.

Sweeney is the former Chief Technologist of the Federal Trade Commission and Editor-in-Chief of Technology Science. Her best known academic work is on the theory of k-anonymity, and she is credited with the observation that "87% of the U.S. population is uniquely identified by date of birth, gender, postal code".

In 2025, she was named one of the world's top thinkers in the field of artificial intelligence by TIME magazine.

== Education ==
Sweeney graduated from Dana Hall School in Wellesley, Massachusetts, receiving her high school diploma in 1977. She delivered the valedictory at the graduation ceremony.

She began her undergraduate work in computer science at the Massachusetts Institute of Technology, but left to found a company. She completed her undergraduate degree in computer science at the Harvard University's Extension School. In 2001, Sweeney was awarded a Ph.D. in computer science from MIT, the first Black woman to do so. Of this career move she has said, "I would do something that was really quite noteworthy, but there was nowhere to publish about it. You could get paid for it, but there was no way to say, 'You won’t believe what I just did!' The only way to get it was to go back to school."

== Career ==
In 2001, Sweeney founded the Data Privacy Lab at Carnegie Mellon University. She was a member of the Program Committee for Modeling Decisions for Artificial Intelligence in 2005. In 2004, she founded the Journal of Privacy Technology, later becoming the editor-in-chief in 2006.

=== Health Insurance Portability and Accountability Act (HIPAA) ===
In 1997, Sweeney conducted her first re-identification experiment wherein she successfully identified the then Governor of Massachusetts, Bill Weld, to his medical records using publicly accessible records. Her results had a significant impact on privacy centered policy making including the health privacy legislation Health Insurance Portability and Accountability Act (HIPAA). However publication of the experiment was rejected twenty times. The several re-identification experiments she conducted after this were met with serious publication challenges as well. In fact, a court ruling in Southern Illinoisian v. Department of Public Health barred her from publication and sharing of her methods for a successful re-identification experiment.

In her landmark article “Only You, Your Doctor, and Many Others May Know,” Sweeney discussed her research project in which she was able to locate and match identities and personal health records through a number of methods. Such methods, as she explains in depth later on, include looking at public health records from hospitals and newspaper stories. Towards the end of the article, Sweeney touches upon the different approaches of how she analyzed and matched the data, either through using computer programs or human effort. She then makes the conclusion that new and improved methods of data sharing are necessary.

=== Medical dataset de-anonymization ===
In 1998 Sweeney published a now famous example about data de-anonymization, demonstrating that a medical dataset that was in the public domain, can be used to identify individuals, regardless the removal of all explicit identifiers, when the medical dataset was combined with a public voter list. Sweeney found that 87% of the US population in a censorship dataset, can be identified by combining data attributes which are known as quasi-identifiers.

=== Data Privacy Lab move to Harvard ===
Since 2011, Sweeney's Data Privacy Lab at Harvard has conducted research on data privacy, integrating perspectives from computer science, law, social science, and public policy. One of its major projects, theDataMap, was funded by the Knight Foundation and documents flows of personal data in the United States, beginning with health information and later expanding to other domains, to increase transparency for policymakers, researchers, and the public.

=== Public Interest Tech Lab ===
In 2021, Sweeney launched the Public Interest Tech Lab at Harvard's Harvard Kennedy School with a $3 million grant from the Ford Foundation. Housed in the Shorenstein Center on Media, Politics and Public Policy, the central focus of the lab is to study the societal impacts of technology and develop projects in the public interest. One of its initial projects was FBarchive, a site which hosts searchable versions of internal Facebook (Meta) documents leaked by whistleblower Frances Haugen in 2021.

The Lab also developed VoteFlare, a nonpartisan service that monitors voter registration databases and alerts users if their records change unexpectedly. Piloted during the 2020 Georgia Senate runoff and special elections and later deployed in Texas and other states, VoteFlare has supported research on voter registration accuracy and interventions to reduce erroneous removals. Studies using its infrastructure have documented violations of federal voter protection rules in Ohio and shown that simple text reminders can significantly increase registration updates among at-risk voters. Another Lab project, MyDataCan, provides individuals with tools to control and manage their own personal data, forming the basis for other privacy-preserving frameworks developed by the Lab.

== See also ==
- Datafly algorithm
- Data re-identification
