= Health Data Consortium =

Organization

- Abbreviation: HDC
- Formation: 2012
- Type: Public–private partnership
- Legal status: NPO
- Headquarters: Washington, D.C.
- Region served: United States
- Executive Director: Chris Boone
- Main organ: Board of Directors
- Website: healthdataconsortium.org

The Health Data Consortium (HDC) is a Washington, D.C.–based public–private partnership that advocates for the availability and use of health data, in particular government health datasets, and the improvement of health and health care through patient data accessibility and innovative use of data. HDC is a 501(c)(3) organization.

== History ==
In 2010, the U.S. Department of Health and Human Services launched the Health Data Initiative to make its data available for public use and, in collaboration with the Institute of Medicine, hosted a public forum featuring various private, non-profit, and entrepreneurial stakeholder groups to explore how the data could be used to promote innovation that would improve people's health. This forum was held again in 2011 and 2012, wherein it was rebranded into its current iteration as the Health Datapalooza.

Due to the success of the forum and growing industry interest, HHS, the Robert Wood Johnson Foundation, the California HealthCare Foundation, and other parties involved believed that there needed to be a structured organization independent of the government that could convene stakeholder groups and promote the health data mission year-round. They approached Forum One Communications to help establish this organization as a public-private partnership, which was named the Health Data Consortium.

=== Leadership ===
In February 2013, Dwayne Spradlin was announced as acting CEO of HDC. He was succeeded by Dr. Christopher Boone, who was appointed Executive Director in October 2014.

== Work ==
=== Health Datapalooza ===
The Health Datapalooza conference continues the work of the Health Data Initiative Forum by convening stakeholders annually. In particular, Health Datapalooza is known for highlighting health care startups that use health data to develop programs and applications by way of a coding challenge or through demos of the applications.

=== Health Data All Stars ===
The Health Data All Stars is a directory of organizations and websites that offer open health datasets for public viewing and use. The directory currently features over fifty open health data entries.

== See also ==
- Public–private partnerships in the United States
