= British Library Sounds =

UK archival sound recordings

British Library Sounds (previously named Archival Sound Recordings) is a British Library service providing free online access to a diverse range of spoken word, music and environmental sounds from the British Library Sound Archive. Anyone with web access can use the service to search, browse and listen to 50,000 digitised recordings. Playback and download of an additional 22,000 recordings is available to Athens or Shibboleth users in UK higher and further education. The service was originally launched with funding by the Jisc.

There are more than 20,000 hours of rarely heard audio material available online. Images and transcripts are also available for some recordings to further enrich the content.

Recordings may be searched by keywords or browsed by collection types, dates, languages, performer names and subjects. Several collections can be browsed using a map interface.

== Content currently available ==
The British Library Sounds website covers a broad range of content:

- Accents and dialects of spoken English, including extracts from the Survey of English Dialects, the Millennium Memory Bank of personal oral histories, the Berliner Lautarchiv of British World War I prisoners, crowdsourced public contributions of accents, BBC Voices project and a 1940s University College London phonetics research collection.
- Arts, literature and performance includes Institute of Contemporary Arts, London – Talks, 1981–92 and early spoken-word recordings (including Florence Nightingale, Christabel Pankhurst, Winston Churchill and Sir Arthur Conan Doyle); and the St Mary-le-Bow public debates.
- Classical music: recordings of Canonical Classical Repertoire 1926-1956 (including all recordings held from the repertoire of Bach, Mozart, Haydn, Beethoven, and Brahms on 78 rpm shellac discs together with early long-playing vinyl discs); a large collection of Chopin performances, and Dutch String Quartet, the London Trio and the Philharmonic Quartet and other chamber music performers, and experimental music.
- Environment and nature, including hundreds of examples of British wildlife sounds, historic wildlife recordings and amphibians sounds, recordings of East African wildlife, and sounds of weather and urban sounds including the pioneering Soundscapes of Canada collection.
- Jazz and popular music has skiffle music, interviews of recordings of British jazz musicians and the complete set of programmes from arts broadcaster Touch Radio.
- Oral history including Holocaust Survivors' Centre interviews, the collection of oral history pioneer George Ewart Evans, BBC Listening Project collection, Oral History of British Science and collections created by National Life Stories.
- Sound recording history including scans of rare early record company catalogues, more than 400 images of historic playback equipment and 100 interviews charting the history of sound recording.
- World and traditional music: a wide range of musical styles from around the world. These range from the Decca Records West Africa "Yellow Label" Series and music of India collected by ethnomusicologist Rolf Killius to Traditional Music in England, a vast collection of 20,000 recordings of popular ballads, children's skipping songs, customs, music hall, soldiers' songs, folk tales and interviews.

== Selected highlights ==
African Writers' Club

More than 250 hours of radio programmes about African literary, social and cultural affairs. Made at the Transcription Centre in London that was established by Dennis Duerden, the recordings were broadcast throughout Africa and sometimes on the BBC World Service. Ranging from radio dramas to magazine programmes, from politics to poetry, as well as music, this collection provides a view of Africa in the mid-1960s. Contributors include Wole Soyinka, Dennis Brutus, Lenrie Peters, John Pepper Clark, Richard Rive, Raymond Kunene, Chinua Achebe, Kofi Awoonor, Cosmo Pieterse, Ama Ata Aidoo, Chris McGregor and the Blue Notes, Dudu Pukwana, and Abdullah Ibrahim.

Art and design interviews

Intimate encounters with the life and work of British painters, sculptors, photographers and architects. Interviewees include sculptors Elisabeth Frink and Eduardo Paolozzi; painters Terry Frost, Paula Rego and Michael Rothenstein; photographers Grace Robertson, Mari Mahr and Helen Chadwick; and architects Denys Lasdun, Ralph Erskine, Edward Hollamby and Patrick Gwynne.

David Rycroft Africa recordings

South African-born linguist and musicologist David Rycroft made many field trips to villages, townships and settlements around South Africa between the 1960s and '80s. Fascinated by the relationship between oral traditions and musical structure, Rycroft focused on unaccompanied choral singing, songs composed for indigenous musical instruments, and urban music.

Klaus Wachsmann Uganda recordings

Klaus Wachsmann made roughly 1,500 unique recordings of indigenous music in Uganda, most of which have never been published before. This collection dates from the late 1940s, when Wachsmann was curator of the Uganda Museum in Kampala, and includes field recordings and performances at the museum.

Oral history of jazz in Britain

An informal and anecdotal history of the music, venues and people that defined jazz in the UK. Through interviews with musicians, promoters and label owners, this collection focuses on some of the less well known aspects of British jazz – including the impact in Britain of overseas musicians, British developments in free improvisation in the 1960s, jazz outside London, and the contribution of women to the music.

Oral history of recorded sound

This teaching package reflects in sound, image and text the cultural and economic impact of developments in recording technology over the 20th century. It also features oral history interviews with significant figures in the worlds of music, radio, and the recording industry – with a focus on backroom innovators who have rarely enjoyed the limelight.

Sound Maps

A series of interactive maps allowing browsing and listening of accents and dialects, nature sounds, oral memories and traditional music.

Soundscapes

The word "soundscape" was coined by composer R. Murray Schafer to identify sounds that “describe a place, a sonic identity, a sonic memory, but always a sound that is pertinent to a place” This selection draws together mechanical and industrial sounds (including transport and fog-horns), soundscapes of the natural world across continents, urban soundscapes, and wildlife sounds from around the globe.

St Mary-le-Bow public debates

At one o’clock every Tuesday lunchtime for fifteen years (1964–79), Joseph McCulloch, the Rector of St Mary-le-Bow Church in the City of London, invited a well-known public figure to debate an issue of the day. Popular among city workers, guests included Enoch Powell on race, Diana Rigg on single parentage, A. J. Ayer on moral responsibility, Edna O’Brien on fear, and Germaine Greer on free will.

Syliphone record label recordings from Guinea

More than 7,800 recordings of music from Guinea were originally released on the Syliphone record label. It includes many unique recordings not previously heard outside of Guinea. A large proportion has not been broadcast in more than 20 years, because it was politically sensitive and subject to censorship. The list of artists and musicians represented in the collection is a who's who of Guinean and African music. There are many unreleased recordings by major stars such as Kandia Sory Kouyaté, Bembeya Jazz National, Fodé Conté, and Kadé Diawara, in addition to hundreds of unreleased recordings by Guinea’s national and regional orchestras, troupes and ensembles. There is also a wealth of material by famous Guinean artists who, as they were never commercially recorded, are virtually unknown outside of Guinea, including Farba Tela (an inspiration to Ali Farka Touré), Mama Kanté, Binta Laaly Sow, Koubia Jazz, and Jeanne Macauley. The collection also features thousands of traditional songs from all of Guinea’s regions and ethnic groups.
