= St Mary-le-Bow public debates =

The St Mary-le-Bow public debates were recorded between 1964 and 1979 at the St Mary-le-Bow Church, London, and feature well-known public figures debating important issues of the time.

== Description ==
The recordings were made every Tuesday lunchtime at 1pm, with the speakers invited by the rector of the church, Joseph McCulloch. The recordings are held by the British Library as part of the Archival Sound Recordings.

== Participants ==
The public debates include interviews with:

- Enoch Powell on race
- Diana Rigg on single parentage
- A. J. Ayer on moral responsibility
- Edna O’Brien on fear
- Germaine Greer on free will
- Peter Cook, comedian and broadcaster, talking about the Devil
- Billie Whitelaw, actress, on various topics including life.

Only a small representative sample of recordings from this collection is available at present.
