= National Life Stories =

Oral history project at the British Library

- Company type: Charitable trust and limited company
- Founded: 1987; 39 years ago
- Founder: Paul Thompson
- Headquarters: 96 Euston Road, NW1 2DB, London, England
- Website: www.bl.uk/nls

National Life Stories (NLS) is an independent charitable trust and limited company (registered as the "National Life Story Collection") based within the British Library Oral History section, whose key focus and expertise is oral history fieldwork. Since 1987 National Life Stories (NLS) has initiated a series of innovative interviewing projects funded almost entirely from sponsorship, charitable and individual donations.

Each NLS project is archived at the British Library and comprises recorded in-depth interviews, plus content summaries and (if funds allow) transcripts to assist users. Alongside the British Library's oral history collections, which stretch back to the beginning of the twentieth century, NLS recordings form a unique and invaluable record of people's lives in Britain today.

== History ==
The proposal for NLS was first developed by Paul Thompson and Asa Briggs in 1985–86. The project for a "National Life Story Collection" had a number of distinct features; it was to be a "life story" project intending to collect full autobiographical material including both written autobiographies as well as recorded "oral history"; and it was intended to "record first-hand experiences of as wide a cross-section of present-day society as possible", combining recordings with both elites (who at that time had been largely neglected by British oral historians) and a cross-section of ordinary men and women.

During 1986, Thompson and Briggs recruited a distinguished body of trustees, including Baroness Ewart-Biggs, Penelope Lively, Austin Mitchell, Sir Russell Johnson MP, Robert Blake, Elizabeth Longford, Professor Peter Laslett, Professor John Saville and Jack Jones (trade unionist). Advisors included Melvyn Bragg. Other important early trustees included the property developer Jack Rose and the first Treasurer, Peter Hands. With Lord Briggs as Chairman and Paul Thompson as Director, an inaugural meeting of the National Life Story Collection (NLS) as a company was held on 11 November 1986, and registration as a charity was obtained in October 1987.

Initial endowment funding for NLS came from Paul Thompson's gift of a Henry Moore sculpture (Working Model For Draped Seated Woman: Figure On Steps), which was sold in 1987, as well as donations from the Wingate Foundation and the Nuffield Foundation.

NLS gained the early support of Dr Christopher Roads, Director of the National Sound Archive (1983–1992) and in return for archiving interviews, NLS was given a free office in the National Sound Archive (then at Exhibition Road, London), materials and technical support. The appointment of a Curator in Oral History, whose role would be to work closely with the National Life Story Collection, was made in late 1988 (Dr Rob Perks, who took over from Thompson as NLS Director in 1995). The first projects established (all in 1988) were City Lives, The Living Memory of the Jewish Community and Leaders of National Life. Artists' Lives, established in 1990, is the longest-running continuous project, with more than 350 interviews. In 2005, National Life Stories was adopted as a trading name.

== Interviewing methodology ==
NLS was initially conceived to have two spheres of activity. One sphere was the creation of a "Life Story Archive" of manuscript autobiographies. However, the main focus was always to be the creation of a "National Biography in Sound", a collection of recorded and transcribed interviews of two kinds; the first was "autobiographical interviews with leading British men and women in all fields – politics, industry, administration, the professions, culture or religion"; and interviews with systematic representatives of ordinary citizens, beginning with a national cross-section of all classes and regions, and then concentrating on particular groups in special need of being recorded. All NLS projects were to follow the in-depth life story approach, starting with family background and childhood, and moving on to education, work and leisure and the community. This methodology has continued to be followed for projects, and each NLS interview normally averages 8 to 15 hours in length.

== Oral History Programme ==
Early projects
The first NLS project was Leaders of National Life, which began in 1988 and which is still added to occasionally. The project aimed to "record autobiographical interviews with leading British men and women covering their life experience as a whole" with subjects selected from all fields – including politics, industry, administration, the professions, culture or religion – in order to achieve a balance. The project specifically aimed to collect interviews with those life stories had not been recorded or published.

As well as the Leaders of National Life project, which was funded from NLS's core funds, NLS sought to undertake "Special Collections" with funding sought from professional associations, industry and other institutions – this is the model that has been used ever since. One of the first of these projects was City Lives, which also began in 1988. It was led by Paul Thompson (with particularly important help from Sir Nicholas Goodison) and later by Cathy Courtney. City Lives was funded entirely from within the City, mostly from smaller donations, but including an especially important grant from the Esmée Fairbairn Foundation. This project resulted in a unique collection of nearly 150 in-depth interviews of the financial elite of the City of London. The project culminated in an exhibition of memorabilia and photographic portraits of City interviewees at the Bank of England Museum, and in the publication of the book City Lives: The Changing Voices of British Finance (Methuen, 1996, ISBN 0-413-67890-3), edited by Cathy Courtney, with an introduction by Paul Thompson. A follow-up project, focusing specifically on Barings Bank (An Oral History of Barings), began in 2009 in partnership with the Baring Archive.

Another "Special Collection", also begun in 1988, was The Living Memory of the Jewish Community (which ran until 1999); the project was led by Jennifer Wingate and received donations from Lord Young and the Clore Foundation. Although the original concept was broader, the project quickly focused its aims on the recording of Jewish Holocaust survivors in Britain, which at that time had been neglected. This project (helped with funding secured through Martin Paisner and the Edith and Ferdinand Porjes Charitable Trust) culminated with the publication of an educational pack, Voices of the Holocaust (British Library, 1994), edited by Carrie Supple and Rob Perks; the educational pack later became an online web resource on the British Library website, Voices of the Holocaust.

Visual arts and crafts
NLS has shown a strong emphasis on recording those involved in the visual arts and in design in general, from architects to theatre designers. The first project to concentrate on the arts was Artists' Lives, which began in 1990 with crucial seed money for five initial interviews provided by the Henry Moore Foundation. The project, which by 2011 had more than 300 interviews, is directed by Cathy Courtney and is run in collaboration with Tate. Artists' Lives has concentrated on painters (through grants especially from the Linbury Trust, the Elephant Trust, the Pilgrim Trust, the Paul Hamlyn Foundation and the Arts Council England) and sculptors (with key support from the Henry Moore Foundation). A smaller proportion of interviews have been carried out with ‘art professionals’ (with support from the Calouste Gulbenkian Foundation). The project had had a number of published outputs including the CDs The Sculptor Speaks: Extracts From Recordings With Post-War British Sculptors and Connecting Lines: Artists Talk About Drawing (which is also available online via the British Library’s website. Some of the interviews with no access restrictions are available online to those within UK Higher Education via the British Library Sounds website. In addition, all of the open interviews, with no access restrictions, are available to researchers at Tate Archive. Recordings sponsored by the Henry Moore Foundation are available at the Henry Moore Institute; recordings sponsored by the Fleming Collection are available via the National Gallery of Scotland archive, and those sponsored by the Yale Center for British Art are available through their archives.

Architects' Lives began in 1990 and at 2011 had interviewed more than 100 architects. Crafts Lives began in 1999 and, at 2011 has interviewed more than 100 studio crafts practitioners, including glass artists, textile artists and furniture makers. Interviews from Architects' Lives and Crafts Lives are available via the British Library Sounds website. Other NLS projects concentrating on visual arts and design (but which are no longer in-progress) include An Oral History of British Fashion (2002 – 2007); and An Oral History of British Theatre Design (2005 – 2008). A project recording the life stories of British Photographers (An Oral History of British Photography) is carried out by the British Library’s Oral History section; some of the interviews with no access restrictions are available online to those within UK Higher Education via the British Library Sounds website.

Industry and utilities
NLS has always strived to capture the life stories of those involved in industry. The original idea was for a project on "Industrial Lives", to collect life-story interviews from top industrial management from the 1950s onwards, in both public and private industries. However, instead of one large project more industry-specific projects emerged. The first of many projects to focus on British utility companies was Lives in Steel (1991 – 1992), which was funded by the General Division of British Steel through the support of David Grieves. This project resulted in the recording of 90 interviews by Alan Dein of former and current staff at all levels of the industry from directors to manual workers. In 1999 another project focusing on British industry, Lives in the Oil Industry, began, a partnership with the University of Aberdeen, running until 2004. The project resulted in an archive of interviews with 177 people involved in all sectors of the industry; a number of BBC Radio 4 Archive Hours have used material from the archive. The most recent project to focus on the British utility industries is An Oral History of the Water Industry, which began in 2009 with sponsorship from Cambridge Water, Northumbria Water, Scottish Water, Southern Water, Wessex Water and Yorkshire Water.

The largest project to focus on one industrial sector was Food: From Source to Salespoint, which ran between 1995 and 2007 and resulted in an archive of more than 202 interviews. The project covered many aspects of the UK food industry, from production through to consumption, and interviewed farmers, butchers, supermarket workers, food technologists and retailers, amongst others. It received sponsorship from a number of the livery companies as well as UK food manufacturers. A supplementary set of recordings with Chefs, funded by Sir John Craven, began in 2009, and Tesco funded their own oral history project (but conducted by NLS) between 2003 and 2007 (Tesco: An Oral History). An Oral History of the Wine Trade (2003 – 2005), was funded by the Vintners' Company and the Institute of Masters of Wine, and gathered a further 40 interviews.

Businesses and corporations National Life Stories has worked in partnership with a number of individual businesses and corporations to collect oral histories with employees from all levels of a corporation. An Oral History of Barings, a project in partnership with the Baring Archive, includes interviews with employees from all levels of the bank, including messengers, secretaries, and one of the bank's first female senior executives. Other corporate-specific projects have been undertaken with the brand consultancy Wolff Olins (An Oral History of Wolff Olins), the Royal Mail Group and The British Postal Museum & Archive (An Oral History of the Post Office) and with Tesco (Tesco: An Oral History).

Writing and publishing
Book Trade Lives, which was led by Martyn Goff and which received generous funding from the Unwin Foundation, ran between 1997 and 2006. The project interviewed nearly 120 of those involved in bookselling from the 1920s through the twentieth century, including secretaries, sales managers, editors and publishers' representatives, and specialists in production and design. A CD featuring extracts from the project titled Book Trade Lives was published by The British Library in 2002 and more than 80 interviews from Book Trade Lives were used in The British Book Trade: An Oral History (British Library, 2008 and 2010), edited by the project interviewer Sue Bradley. A complementary project, Authors' Lives, began in 2007, and includes life story interviews with novelists, poets, biographers, historians and children's writers. The Writing Life: Authors Speak, a CD containing edited extracts from the collection, was published in 2011. An Oral History of British Press ran between 1994 and 2006, and collected the life stories of key press and newspaper figures.

Science
In 2009, NLS received funding from the Arcadia Fund and the Royal Commission for the Exhibition of 1851 for a new project (Oral History of British Science). The project has collected more than 100 audio interviews, each 8 to 15 hours in length, with scientists, engineers and others linked with science and technology in Britain, as well as shorter on-location video recordings, over two themed strands: Made in Britain and A Changing Planet. In 2013, National Life Stories began a new oral history project titled "Inspiring Scientists: Diversity in British Science", in partnership with the Royal Society Diversity Programme. Interviewees range from Professors to PhD students and the focus on science is wide, covering academia, big industry and individual entrepreneurship. Many of the interviews recorded for the projects are available in full on British Library Sounds, while the Voices of Science web resource provides curated access to audio and video highlights from the interviews organised by theme, discipline and interviewee.

Other projects
The Fawcett Collection was a project supported by The Women's Library, which ran between 1990 and 1992, collecting. Rebecca Abrams' book Woman in a Man's World (Methuen, 1993, ISBN 0-413-66350-7) was based on this collection.

Pioneers in Charity and Social Welfare (2004 – present) was initiated with funding from the J. Paul Getty Jnr Charitable Trust, and comprises interviews with key (and often unsung) individuals connected to social welfare, social policy and charity work.

A national cross-section
The attempt to record a ‘national cross-section’ of life stories of ordinary men and women has been approached in a number of different ways. The first was through a life story competition. In 1991, NLS received a pilot grant from the Literature section of the Arts Council of England to develop the National Life Story Awards as an independent written and audio autobiographical competition; additional funding was received from the European Community Year of Older People and ITV Telethon. The project was especially well-publicised on both radio and television, and the ambitious official launch included Lord Soper, Baroness Blackstone and Glenda Jackson. There were nearly 950 entries, of which 710 were written and 217 recorded (fifteen in video); twenty entries reached the final shortlist all of which highlighted a striking range of social background. The judges for the final round were Asa Briggs, Penelope Lively, Ann Paul, Rob Perks and Paul Thompson, and the awards ceremony at the Barbican in September 1994 was compared by Melvyn Bragg, one of NLS's long-standing Advisors.

A second initiative for a national "memory bank" was first discussed in 1996 and an application was made to the Millennium Commission. Eventually, a joint scheme (1998–2000), with the British Library leading with NLS as a partner along with the BBC, resulted in The Century Speaks: Millennium Oral History Project, archived at the British Library as The Millennium Memory Bank.

== Full list of projects ==
- City Lives: 1988–present
- Leaders of National Life: 1988–present
- The Living Memory of the Jewish Community: 1988–1999 [187 interviews]
- Artists Lives: 1990–present
- NLS: General: 1990–present
- The Fawcett Collection: 1992–1994 [14 interviews]
- Lives in Steel: 1991–1992 [88 interviews]
- The National Life Story Awards: 1993–1994
- Holocaust Survivors Centre Interviews: 1993–2014 [154 interviews]
- An Oral History of the British Press: 1994–2006 [19 interviews]
- Legal Lives: 1995–2014 [11 interviews]
- Food: From Source to Salespoint: 1995–2007 [202 interviews]
- Book Trade Lives: 1997–2006 [119 interviews]
- Crafts Lives: 1999–present
- Lives in the Oil Industry: 2000–2004 [177 interviews]
- An Oral History of the Post Office: 2001–2003 [116 interviews]
- An Oral History of Wolff Olins: 2001–2003 [40 interviews]
- An Oral History of British Fashion: 2002–2011 [17 interviews]
- Tesco: An Oral History: 2003–2007 [37 interviews]
- An Oral History of the Wine Trade: 2003–2004 [40 interviews]
- Pioneers in Charity and Social Welfare: 2004–present
- An Oral History of British Theatre Design: 2005–2008 [33 interviews]
- Authors' Lives: 2007–present
- Chefs: 2009 – 2012 [13 interviews] [part of the Food: From Source to Salespoint project]
- An Oral History of the Water Industry: 2009–2012 [30 interviews]
- An Oral History of Barings: 2009–2013 [34 interviews]
- An Oral History of British Science: 2009–present
- An Oral History of the Electricity Supply Industry in the UK: 2012–present

== Access ==
All NLS interviews and projects are catalogued on the British Library Sound & Moving Image catalogue. Researchers can listen to interviews onsite at the British Library at St Pancras and Boston Spa, either by making an appointment with the Listening & Viewing Service or, if the interview is available digitally, via the SoundServer service. Some NLS interviews (from Artists' Lives, Architects' Lives, The Living Memory of the Jewish Community, Millennium Memory Bank and An Oral History of British Science) are available via the British Library Sounds website.

Updates on NLS projects are available through the National Life Stories Annual Reports and also through the British Library's Sound and Vision blog and, specifically for Oral History of British Science, the History of Science blog.

== Trustees past and present ==
Chairman

- Asa Briggs (1987–1995)
- Martyn Goff (1995–2003)
- Sir Nicholas Goodison (2003–2015)
- Dame Jenny Abramsky (2015–present)

Director

- Paul Thompson (oral historian) (Founder, Director 1987–1995)
- Robert Perks (Associate Director 1987–1995, Director 1995–2021)
- Mary Stewart (Director 2021–present)

Treasurer

- Peter Hands (1987–1994)
- Dr Stephen Peretz-Brown (1994–1995)
- Eric de Bellaigue (1995–2005)
- Bob Boas (2005–present)

Current Trustees

- Dame Jenny Abramsky (2015–present)
- Professor Jon Agar (2017–present)
- Professor Fareda Banda (2022–present)
- Bob Boas (1995–present)
- Professor Nelarine Cornelius (2021–present)
- Dr Andrew Flinn (2018–present)
- Amanda Game (2017–present)
- Bill Knight OBE (2011–present)
- Dr Robert Perks (1998–present)
- Dr Jo Reilly (2012–present)
- Mary Stewart (2021–present)
- Paul Thompson (oral historian) (1987–present)
- Dr Janet Topp Fargion (2020–present)

Former Trustees

- Eric de Bellaigue (1996–2005)
- Asa Briggs (1987–2004)
- Prof. Mary Chamberlain (1992–2004)
- Sir John Craven (2000– )
- Elyse Dodgson (1988–2001)
- Jane Ewart-Biggs (1988–died 1992)
- Mark Fisher (1993–2003)
- Roger Gavin (2009–2022)
- Martyn Goff OBE (1992–2004)
- Sir Nicholas Goodison (2000–2015)
- Dundas Hamilton (1988–1994)
- Peter Hands (1987–1994)
- Peter Hennessy (2013– )
- Steve Howard (2007–2009)
- Crispin Jewitt (1994–2007)
- Sharon Johnson (2005–2007)
- Russell Johnston (1900–1992)
- Lesley Knox (2013–2016)
- Peter Laslett (1988–1991)
- Penelope Lively (1989–2013)
- Dr Scot McKendrick (2011–2014)
- Stephen Peretz-Brown (1994–died 1996)
- James Quinn (1988–1991)
- Richard Ranft (2015–2020)
- Waheeb Rizk (1990–1994)
- Christopher Roads (1987–1992)
- Jack Rose (1987–1996)
- John Saville (1988–1991)
- Prof. Dorothy Sheridan MBE (1994–2017)
- Sir Harry Solomon (2005–2013)
- Jonathan Taylor (1997–2008)
- Hodson Thornber (2017–2020)
- Rayner Unwin (1998–2000)
- Caroline Waldegrave (2005–2012)
- David Webster (2005–2015)

== See also ==
- National Sound Archive
- British Library
- National memory
