= Peter Copeland =

British archivist

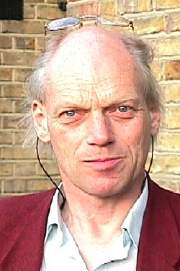
Peter Copeland (1998)

Peter Michael Copeland (17 July 1942 – 30 July 2006) was an English sound archivist.

From an early age he had a deep interest in collecting old gramophone records and in sound recording. In 1961 he joined the BBC World Service as a Technical Operator in the Control Room at Bush House, undertaking recording operations on disk (Note: Recording onto 78rpm direct-cut disks was in use until the mid-1960s for short items to be played into transmissions and longer recordings – there were no tape machines in any studio until about 1967.) and tape as well as Control Room routing. In 1964 he became a Studio Manager – operating studio mixing desks and playback equipment – at Broadcasting House, moving on to the BBC Regional studios at Bristol in 1966 where he eventually became the principal Film Dubbing Mixer, (Note: The term used in the BBC for the final mixdown of the component parts of a films sound track (elsewhere the term 'dubbing' means replacement of voices for language or singing reasons).) responsible for, among many other things, the final mix on David Attenborough's wildlife series Life on Earth.

During this time he also ran a small disc-cutting business as a sideline under the name Gosport Sound Products (he grew up in Gosport, Hampshire) – initially in his flat at Anerley, South London, and then in a small office in Bristol – doing long-playing disc copies of private recordings such as weddings (this was before the advent of cheap tape and cassette recorders) and disk mastering for subsequent pressings to be made.

As BBC Bristol was the home of the Natural History Unit, he developed an interest in making birdsong and wildlife recordings: he once paid for a holiday in Australia by recording wildlife atmospheres during it and selling them to the BBC Sound Archive. (Note: The BBC Sound Archive keeps not only samples of various programmes and historical events, but also a comprehensive collection of wildlife recordings so that the correct animals or birds can be used in the backgrounds of films and dramas.)

In 1986 he left the BBC and took up the post of Conservation Manager and later become the Head of Sound Conservation at the National Sound Archive (now part of the British Library) which essentially performs much the same functions for sound recordings as the Library does for books and other publications. He was instrumental in effecting the move to digital archiving (Note: Initially done on Betamax or VHS video recorders, recording a digital audio signal instead of video (using the Sony PCM-F1). As time progressed research was done into other formats such as optical disk.) using the new techniques which were becoming available: he also did extensive research into the highly specialised and complex area of accurate reproduction of old recordings.

He retired from the NSA (by then called the British Library Sound Archive) in 2002 on reaching the age of 60, but continued to act as a consultant until his death from a diabetes-related heart attack on 30 July 2006. He was still working on a Manual of Analogue Sound Restoration Techniques – a mammoth opus with sections on conversion to digital formats, noise reduction, correct methods of playing and equalizing 78 RPM and other old recordings: the British Library has published this manual electronically on its website. His huge collection of rare and unusual gramophone records and other sound recordings has been donated to the British Library Sound Archive.

== Bibliography ==
- Copeland, Peter. Sound Recordings. London: the British Library, 1991. ISBN 0-7123-0225-5.
- Copeland, Peter, Jeffery Boswall, and Leonard Petts. Birdsongs on Old Records. London: the Authors in association with the British Library of Wildlife Sounds, 1987. ISBN 0-900208-06-6.
- Copeland, Peter. Memoirs of a Record Collector and Sound Recording Engineer: The Autobiography of Peter Copeland (1942 -2006) Independently published, 2021. ISBN 979-8703265536. Also available as a Kindle e-book.

== Sources ==
- ARSC Newsletter obituary and appreciations by Nigel Bewley and George Brock-Nannestad, p. 10
- References in British Library documents
- Article by Prof. Sean Street
- BBC Radio 4's "Last Word' – page for edition including a tribute to Copeland.
- – Peter Copeland's autobiography
