= Oral History of British Science =

An Oral History of British Science is an oral history project conducted by National Life Stories at the British Library. The project began in 2009 with funding from the Arcadia Fund, the Royal Commission for the Exhibition of 1851 and a number of other private donors and focuses on audio interviews with British science and engineering figures.

== Project background ==
The project focused on 200 video interviews lasting 8–15 hours, with four themes: Made in Britain, A Changing Planet, Cosmologies and Biomedicine. The project Advisory Committee included Jon Agar, Alec Broers, Tilly Blyth, Georgina Ferry, Dame Julia Higgins, Maja Kominko, Sir Harry Kroto, John Lynch, Chris Rapley and Simone Turchetti.

An Oral History of British Science was conducted by National Life Stories (NLS) at the British Library, and formed part of a wider institutional initiative to better document contemporary history of science and technology through the addition of audio visual sources as well as written sources.

== Methodology ==
The oral history of British science follows the biographical, or life story, oral history approach with each audio interview averaging 8 to 15 hours in length. The interviews cover the individual’s career history, education, background and family.

== Access to interviews ==
All interviews are catalogued on the Sound and Moving Image Catalogue. Interviews which are complete and open are accessible onsite at the Library in St Pancras, London and in Boston Spa, Yorkshire via the Library’s Listening & Viewing Service. Interviews which are open are also made accessible via the Archival Sound Recordings website under the ‘Oral history of British science’ content package.

== People interviewed ==
Interviewed for ‘A Changing Planet’:

- Barbara Bowen (Geophysics technician/ research assistant)
- Joe Farman (Geophysicist)
- John Glen (Glaciologist)
- A.T. (Dick) Grove (Geographer/ geomorphologist)
- David Jenkinson (Soil Scientist)
- Desmond King-Hele (Physicist)
- John Kington (Meteorologist and climatologist)
- James Lovelock (Geochemist)
- Melvyn Mason (Technician in seismic refraction)
- Dan McKenzie (geophysicist)
- Stephen Moorbath (Geologist and Geochronologist)
- John Nye (scientist) (Physicist, Theoretical glaciologist)
- Charles Swithinbank (Glaciologist)
- Janet Thomson (Geologist)
- Sue Vine (Geophysicist technician/ research assistant)
- Richard West (Botanist and Quaternary Geologist)

Interviewed for ‘Made in Britain’:

- Raymond Bird (Computer Engineer)
- Tony Brooker (Computer Scientist)
- Mary Coombs (Computer Programmer)
- Sir Alan Cottrell (Metallurgist and Physicist)
- Dai Edwards (Computer Engineer);
- Roy Gibson (Aerospace Engineer)
- Andy Hopper (Computer Engineer)
- Frank Land (Computer Scientist)
- Bob Parkinson (Aerospace Engineer)
- Dame Stephanie Shirley (Computer Scientist)
- Geoff Tootill (Computer Engineer)
- Maurice Wilkes (Computer Engineer)

Interviewed under ‘Biomedicine’:

- Sammy Lee (scientist) (Clinical embryologist)
