= Patrick Saul =

English sound archivist

Anthony Patrick Hodgins Saul OBE (15 October 1913 – 9 May 1999) was an English sound archivist.

Known as Patrick Saul, he was born in Dover, the son of a dentist. The family's house overlooked the seafront meaning they were inadvertently entertained by a brass band during the summer. He was educated at Dover College, a public school, but his musical education came from records and overseas radio stations. He began his working life as a bank clerk and was a conscientious objector during World War II. After the war, he gained a Psychology degree read as an external mature student of London University, later working as an organiser of extension lectures at the university's Birbeck College.

At the end of the war, Saul met The Times music critic, Frank Howes, who encouraged him to pursue his idea for a national sound archive. The Association of Libraries and Information Bureaux (Aslib) held a conference on the need for a national sound archive in 1947 resulting in the a working committee being established chaired by Howes. It became a formal institute in 1948 with Saul as secretary and his own collection at its core. The British Institute of Recorded Sound moved into public premises, and became an educational charity in 1955. Saul and the new organisations governors appealed to the public for donations saying nothing would be rejected "on aesthetic grounds". One governor said at the time: "We cannot tell just what will interest posterity… the only safe rule is to be omnivorous." The BIRS eventually became the British Library Sound Archive.

His own favourite recording in the archive he created was of the mating call of the haddock. A Francophile, his personal taste was for French music, though this did not prejudice the priorities of the collection. He was involved in establishing the International Association of Sound Archives in 1969 and was a member of its executive committee for many years.

Patrick Saul was created OBE in 1971, the same year he married Diana Hull. He retired as BIRS director in 1978, but maintained a consulting role for another five years. At the time, Lord Boyle of Handsworth, who was Financial Secretary to the Treasury when the Archive received government funding in the early 1960s, described Patrick Saul's career as one of "quite exceptional modesty and humility on the one side and ruthless determination on the other." He died in Kingston upon Thames; his wife survived him.
