= British Library Sound Archive =

Collections of recorded sound

Coordinates: 51.5298°N 0.1275°W

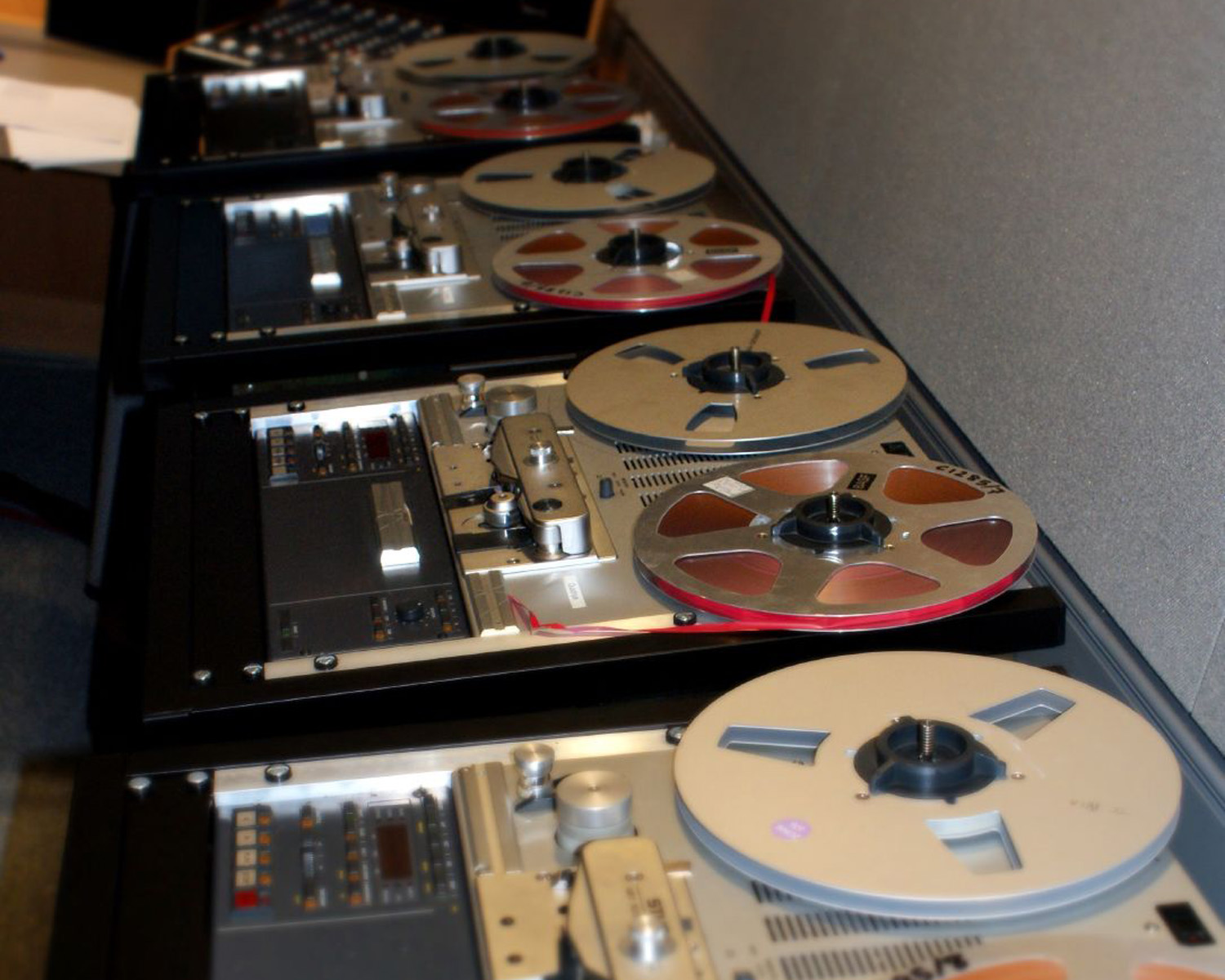
- The Archive became part of the British Library in 1983.
- Location: 96, Euston Road, London, England, NW1 2DB, United Kingdom

Collection
- Size: 6,500,000 recordings

Other information
- Website: British Library Sound Archive

The British Library Sound Archive, formerly the British Institute of Recorded Sound; also known as the National Sound Archive (NSA), in London, England is among the largest collections of recorded sound in the world, including music, spoken word and ambient recordings. It holds more than six million recordings, including over a million discs and 200,000 tapes. These include commercial record releases (chiefly from the UK), radio broadcasts (many from the BBC Sound Archive), and privately made recordings. The sound archive's catalogue (SAMI) was restored after the 2023 cyber attack on the British Library, but the BL Sounds website is currently unavailable.

== History ==
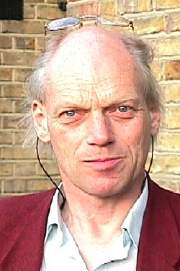
Peter Copeland began digitising the collection in the 1990s.

The history of the Sound Archive can be traced back to 1905, when it was first suggested that the British Museum should have a collection of audio recordings of poets and statesmen. The Gramophone Company started donating metal masters of audio recordings in 1906 (on the basis that records would wear out), with a number of donations being made up until 1933. These recordings included some by Nellie Melba, Adelina Patti, Caruso and Francesco Tamagno, and others of Lev Tolstoy, Ernest Shackleton, Herbert Beerbohm Tree and Lewis Waller. A number of shellac pressings were also donated in the period 1920–50.

Conflicting accounts exist regarding the founding of the British Institute of Recorded Sound (BIRS).

Sound archivist Patrick Saul founded the British Institute of Recorded Sound (BIRS) in 1955, after realising that material was in danger of being lost as the British Museum did not maintain a comprehensive archive. The institute was located in a property owned by the British Museum in Russell Square (with rent and rates guaranteed by Robert Mayer), and supported by a donation from the Quaker trust in Birmingham. A public appeal resulted in the donation of thousands of shellac discs, which started off the collection.

The claim made in the 1995 obituary of British Museum music librarian and BIRS director Alexander Hyatt King in The Independent that he founded the BIRS seven years earlier in 1948, is misleading. In 1973 Saul recalled that Hyatt King was chairman of the embryonic Institute in 1953 (the second chairman, following Frank Howes), and was responsible for finding accommodation for the collection within the British Museum.

The British Institute of Recorded Sound became part of the British Library, which had been split off from the British Museum, in April 1983. It was later renamed the British Library Sound Archive. The metal masters originally collected by the British Museum were transferred to the Archive in 1992. Patrick Saul was the first head of the archive. He was succeeded in 1978/9 by Dr Anthony King who was in post until 1982. His successor from 1983-1992 was Christopher Roads, followed by Crispin Jewitt from 1993-2007, then Richard Ranft from 2007-2020. The current head is Janet Topp Fargion.

=== Save Our Sounds ===
In 2015 the library launched the 'Save Our Sounds' programme to address the urgent need to digitise unique recordings in the UK's sound archives. These recordings are at risk of being lost due to deterioration of physical recording formats and decreasing availability of playback devices. The aims of the programme are:

- to preserve as much as possible of the nation's rare and unique sound recordings, including items from other UK national and regional collections and from other groups and individuals
- to establish a national radio archive
- to invest in new technology to enable the archive to receive music in born-digital formats

==== Unlocking Our Sound Heritage ====
As part of Save Our Sounds, between 2017 and 2022 'Unlocking Our Sound Heritage', a network of ten regional centres across the UK, was set up to digitise a wide range of recordings held in local archives, including music, radio broadcasts, drama, oral history and wildlife recordings.

== Collections ==
The specialist collections are:

- Classical music
- Drama and literature
- Oral history
- Moving images
- Popular music and jazz
- Radio recordings
- Spoken language and dialects
- Wildlife and other nature sounds
- World and traditional music

=== Printed materials ===
The Sound Archive holds an extensive reference collection of printed materials relating to recordings. The collection includes books and periodicals from around the world, a wide-ranging collection of discographies, and one of the largest collections of commercial record catalogues dating back to the early 1900s.

=== Historic playback equipment ===
A reference collection of playback and recording devices, including historic gramophones and record players, that chart the history of sound reproduction equipment. Photographs of some of these may be viewed online. In addition, the Sound Archive's engineering department maintains a wide selection of working playback tape and disc players for the purposes of digitising its sound collections.

== Services ==
The Sound Archive provides a range of services. The Sound Archive's online catalogue of over 1.5 million recordings can be viewed online, and it is updated daily. Recordings may be listened to free of charge in the British Library Reading Rooms. Copies of recordings can be purchased subject to copyright clearance and spectrograms of wildlife sounds can be made to order. The British Library Sounds service provides free online access for UK higher and further education institutions to over 90,000 rare recordings of music, spoken word, and human and natural environments. 65% of these recordings are also freely accessible for public listening online.

=== Educational services ===
The British Library offers training workshops and events in oral history and wildlife sound recording, as well as audiovisual archiving internships.

== Publications ==
Playback, the bulletin of the British Library Sound Archive, was published free of charge from 1992 to 2010. All 44 issues are available online. A range of British Library CDs are available covering nature sounds, world music, historical speeches and recordings of famous poets, playwrights and authors.

== See also ==
- Theatre Archive Project Oral History strand.
- British Library Sounds free online access to over 90,000 sound tracks.
- Peter Copeland Conservation Manager of the National Sound Archive/British Library Sound Archive from 1986 to 2002.
- National Life Stories, an independent charitable trust within the Oral History section of the British Library.
