= St Mary-le-Bow =

Coordinates: 51°30′50″N 0°05′37″W

- Parish Church of Saint Mary-le-Bow
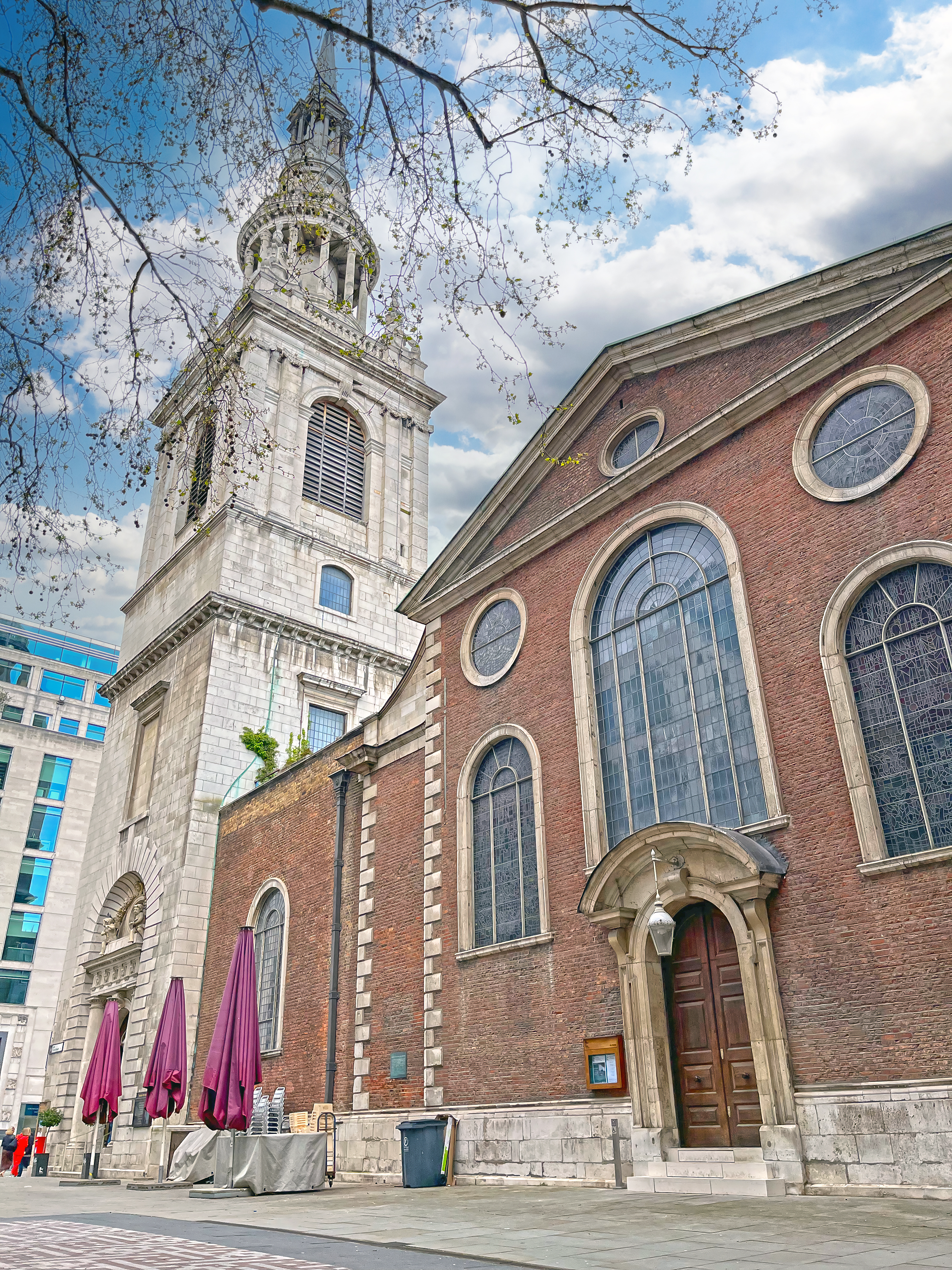
- View from Bow Churchyard

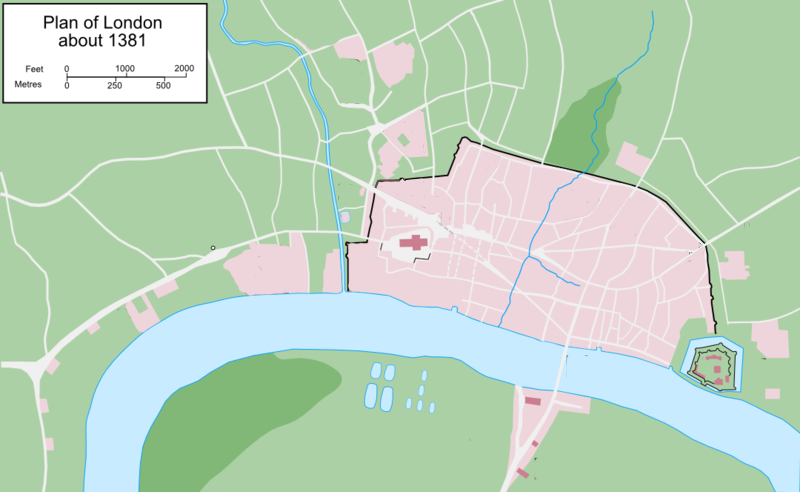
- Location within City of London Location within City of London in 1300
- OS grid reference: TQ 32386 81143
- Location: Cheapside, City of London, EC2
- Country: England
- Language: English
- Denomination: Church of England
- Previous denomination: Roman Catholic (to 1536)
- Website: stmarylebow.org.uk

History
- Founded: 1080
- Founder: Lanfranc
- Dedication: Mary, mother of Jesus

Architecture
- Architects: Sir Christopher Wren; Laurence King (to Wren's design)
- Style: English Baroque
- Years built: 1670–1680

Administration
- Province: Canterbury
- Diocese: London
- Archdeaconry: London
- Deanery: The City
- Benefice: St Mary-le-Bow

The Church of St Mary-le-Bow (/lə ˈboʊ/, rhymes with 'know') is a Church of England parish church in the City of London, England. Located on Cheapside, one of the city's oldest thoroughfares, the church was founded in 1080, by Lanfranc, Archbishop of Canterbury. Rebuilt several times over the ensuing centuries, the present church is the work of Sir Christopher Wren, following the Great Fire of London (1666). With its tall spire, it is still a landmark in the City of London, being the third highest of any Wren church, surpassed only by nearby St Paul's Cathedral and St Bride's, Fleet Street. At a cost of over £15,000, it was also his second most expensive, again only surpassed by St Paul's Cathedral.

St Mary-le-Bow is widely known for its bells, which also feature in the nursery rhyme "Oranges and Lemons". According to legend, Dick Whittington heard the bells calling him back to the city in 1392, leading him to become Lord Mayor. Traditionally, anyone born within earshot of the bells was considered to be a true Londoner, or Cockney.

The church suffered severe damage by the Luftwaffe in the Second World War as part of the Blitz, like many churches in London. The interior was reduced to a shell, and though the tower survived, fire damage made the bells crash to the floor. The church was restored to its pre-war condition by Laurence King from 1956 to 1964. The church was awarded Grade I listed status, the highest possible rating, on the National Heritage List for England, whilst still a shell in 1950.

== History ==
=== Foundation ===
Though archaeological excavations suggest an earlier Saxon building may have stood on the site prior to the Norman Conquest, the first confirmed church dedicated to St Mary on Cheapside was built by Lanfranc, Archbishop of Canterbury, in 1080. Lanfranc, who was William the Conqueror's archbishop brought over from Normandy, founded the church as part of the Norman policy of dominating London. Three major buildings were constructed as part of this policy; St Paul's Cathedral, the Tower of London, and a church on Cheapside.

The church at Cheapside was dedicated to St Mary and was constructed from Caen stone from Normandy, the same stone used in the Tower of London. The architect for the Tower of London was Gundulf, Bishop of Rochester, who may have also designed the first St Mary-le-Bow. This early church was built on two levels, with a lower undercroft partially below street level and the upper church, built above it. The lower church was constructed first and featured round stone arches, which were a novelty at the time. This led to the church being known as Sancta Maria de Arcubus (St Mary of the Arches), a name which eventually became St Mary-le-Bow, bow being an old name for arches.

=== 11th and 12th centuries ===
The church was nearing completion in 1091 when it was destroyed by a violent tornado, amongst the most powerful ever to strike England. Roof rafters measuring 27–28 feet (8.2–8.5 m) long were thrown up in the air and forced into the ground with such force that only their tips remained visible. The lower church survived, but the upper church was damaged beyond repair. The church was rebuilt, possibly in facsimile, but was destroyed again just a hundred years later, in a fire in 1196. The fire was caused by fugitive William Fitz Osbert hiding in the church tower, and to coax him out, supporters of the Archbishop of Canterbury set fire to the church. Osbert was fatally stabbed as he fled.

=== Late medieval period ===
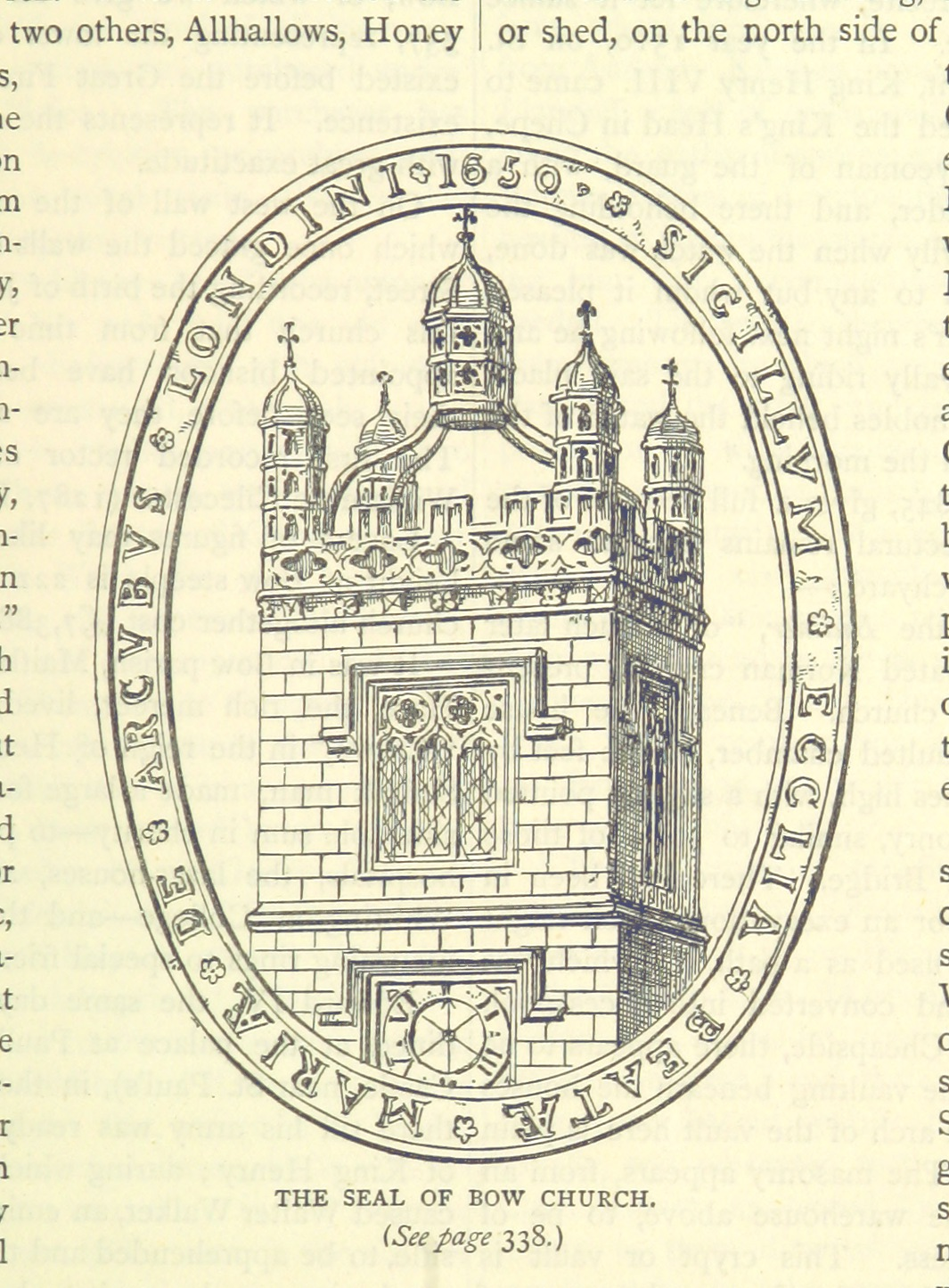
The tower of St. Mary-le-Bow as it appeared before the Great Fire

The church was rebuilt again in the early 13th century following the 1196 fire, becoming a peculiar of the Archbishops of Canterbury and their London headquarters. It became home to the Court of Arches, to which the church gave its name. The Court of Arches, which still has its home at St Mary-le-Bow today, was the ecclesiastical court of appeal for the Province of Canterbury, founded in 1251. This allegiance to Canterbury made it the second most important church in London, after St Paul's Cathedral.

The tower partially collapsed in its south west corner in 1271, killing at least one civilian in Cheapside below, Laurence Ducket. The tower was not immediately repaired and was kept in use. From 1363 onwards, the tower's principal use was the housing of the city's curfew bell, rung at 9 pm every evening and being able to be heard as far away as Hackney Marshes.

Work to repair the tower was slow, with construction noted to take place in 1448, 1459 and 1479. The tower was finally completed in 1512, supporting a spectacular series of stone lanterns; four around the corners of the tower and one suspended in the centre by arches. These lanterns were designed to light the streets below.

==== Destruction during the Great Fire of London (1666) ====
Soon after midnight on Sunday, 2 September 1666, a fire started in Thomas Farriner's bakery on Pudding Lane, 0.7 kilometres (0.43 mi) to the southeast of St. Mary-le-Bow. During the course of the night, the easterly wind spread the fire through the city, consuming 300 houses in the first night alone. The fire continued to grow, becoming a firestorm on Monday and sweeping west towards St Paul's Cathedral.

St Mary-le-Bow was one of over fifty churches to catch fire during the firestorm, which was only extinguished on the Thursday. The church was nearly completely destroyed, except for the tower, which survived albeit with fire damage. Attempts were made to repair the tower, but they all ultimately failed: the tower was structurally compromised from the fire and was no longer strong enough to support the ringing of bells.

=== Wren rebuilding ===
Following Christopher Wren's appointment as the King's Surveyor of Works in 1669, Wren's office was contracted to rebuild the fifty one churches of the city consumed by the fire. The Rebuilding of London Act 1670 provided the funds for this, as it included raising the tax on coal. Other than St Paul's Cathedral, St Mary-le-Bow was considered the most important church in the city, and thus, according to a document dated to 13 June 1670, at the head of the list to be rebuilt. The mason's contract for the rebuilding of St Mary-le-Bow was signed just under two months later, on 2 August.

Wren's initial designs were for a simple three bay structure and short tower, the latter topped by a simple cupola. This was revised in the same year with a much taller tower and more intricate spire. The body of the church, inspired by the Basilica of Maxentius in Rome, was completed by 1673. The tower, however, would take a further seven years to finish, being finally completed in 1680. The total cost of the rebuilding was £15,421 (equivalent to more than £2.3 million in 2021), the second most expensive of any of Wren's churches, only surpassed by St Paul's. The tower was rebuilt in Portland stone, the rest of the church in brick. The tower became such a landmark that it was known as the "Cheapside pillar".

During the rebuilding, Wren moved the position of the tower to sit directly on Cheapside, whereas the Norman and Tudor towers had sat back from the road. Whilst building the foundations for the tower, Wren came across an old Roman causeway 18 feet (5.5 m) below ground level and 4 feet (1.2 m) deep, which provided a solid foundation. Wren also discovered the 11th century undercroft below the ruins, but he was uninterested, believing it to be Roman. He only provided a trapdoor and ladder into the undercroft, which became the crypt for the church above it.

=== 18th – 20th centuries ===
In 1820, the upper part of the spire was rebuilt and repaired by architect George Gwilt. In 1850, the church finally ceased to be a "peculiar", coming under the jurisdiction of the Diocese of London, ending a practice started six hundred years earlier. The church continued, however, to be the home of the Court of Arches. Further alterations took place in the late 19th century, with the removal of galleries in 1867 and additional modifications from 1878 to 1879.

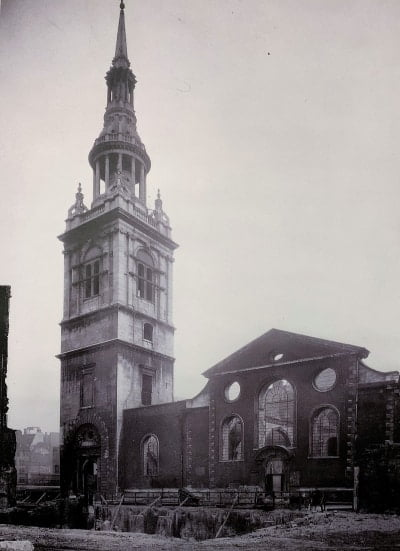
The ruins of St. Mary-le-Bow after the Blitz

In 1914, a stone from the crypt of the church was placed in Trinity Church, New York, to mark the fact that William III granted the vestry of Trinity Church the same privileges as St Mary-le-Bow vestry.

==== Second World War ====
Beginning in 1940, the Luftwaffe began bombarding British cities from the air, a campaign known as the Blitz; London was struck especially heavily. Throughout most of the campaign, St Mary-le-Bow suffered only minor damage. However, on the final night of the Blitz, 10–11 May 1941, the church took several direct hits. A major fire started, destroying most of the building except the outer walls and the tower. The tower was not directly hit, but the fires from the church interior spread, burning out the tower floors and causing its bells to crash to the floor. The use of Portland stone in the tower, rather than the brick used in the body of the church, contributed to its survival.

From 1956 to 1964, the church was sympathetically rebuilt and restored by Laurence King to Wren's designs, at a cost of £63,000. The tower survived, mostly as Wren left it, but part of it required rebuilding due to fire damage weakening the walls. The church was reconsecrated in 1964, achieving Grade I listed status whilst still a ruin in 1950.

== Architecture ==
=== Plan ===
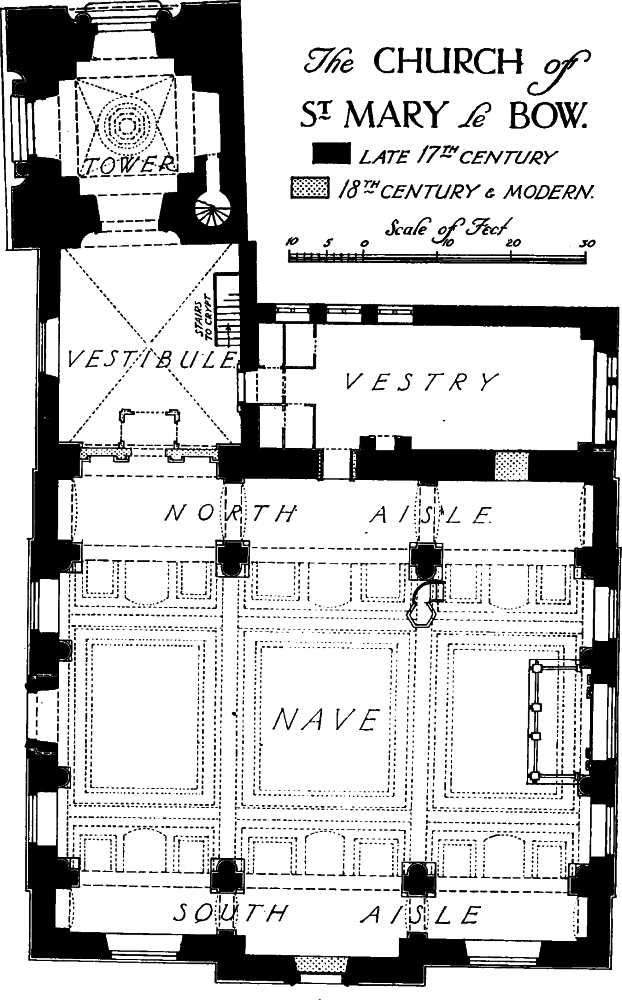
Floor plan

The church building has a rectangular plan, with the tower situated on the northwest corner, separated from the main body of the church by a vestibule. The design of the church is such that the chancel occupies the eastern end of the nave, both with north and south aisles, which are noted to be extremely narrow. A vestry adjoins the vestibule to the north of the north aisle.

Unusually, due to the addition of the vestibule separating the tower and nave, the building has a greater length north to south than east to west; measuring 79 feet (24 m) from east to west but 131 feet (40 m) from the north wall of the tower to the south wall of the nave. The total area of the church building is 761 square metres (8,190 sq ft), which according to the Church of England, makes it a "large" sized church building. (Note: The Church of England categorise church buildings by size, with anything under 200 sq m considered to be "small", between 200 and 599 sq m as "medium", between 600 and 999 sq m as "large", and anything above that as "very large".)

=== Exterior ===
The exterior of St Mary-le-Bow is mostly constructed from red brick with dressings of Portland stone, with the exception of the tower, which is built entirely from Portland stone. The three principal facades of the building (south, north and east) have gabled walls and pedimented centres, complete with triplets of round-headed windows. The most prominent aspect of the exterior is Wren's imposing tower, measuring 30 feet (9.1 m) square externally and with a height of 221 feet 9 inches (67.6 m), it is the third highest of any Wren church.

The tower, constructed of Portland stone, is formed of four stages surmounted by an elaborate stone spire. The lowest stage has doorways in the north and west faces of the tower, set in substantial stone recess with added rustication. The recess has a round head and is flanked by Doric order columns, which support a moulded entablature above. The doorways inside these recesses are set between Tuscan order columns which support a Doric frieze. The second and third stages of the tower are more simple in construction, with two large square windows to the second stage, and a single round-headed window to the third. The fourth stage, housing the bell chamber, has a large round-headed opening in each wall, divided into three sections by thin mullions and filled with louvre boards. Framing the bell openings are pairs of Ionic order pilasters supporting an entablature, above which is the parapet. The parapet comprises an open balustrade between four corner pinnacles, formed of four ogee scrolls topped with small stone vases.

The spire above the tower is also formed of four stages. The lowest stage is a circular drum-shaped structure surrounded by twelve columns which have carved acanthus capitals. These twelve columns support a cornice with modillion decoration. Above the cornice is a second open balustrade, similar in design to that on the top of the tower. The second stage is formed of twelve curved flying buttresses which support a circular-shaped moulded cornice. The third stage stands on the base of the cornice, and is square in plan, with granite columns on the corners. These columns support the fourth and final stage of the spire, which takes the form of a tall, square, tapering pinnacle, surmounted by a ball and weathervane, the latter taking the shape of a winged dragon.

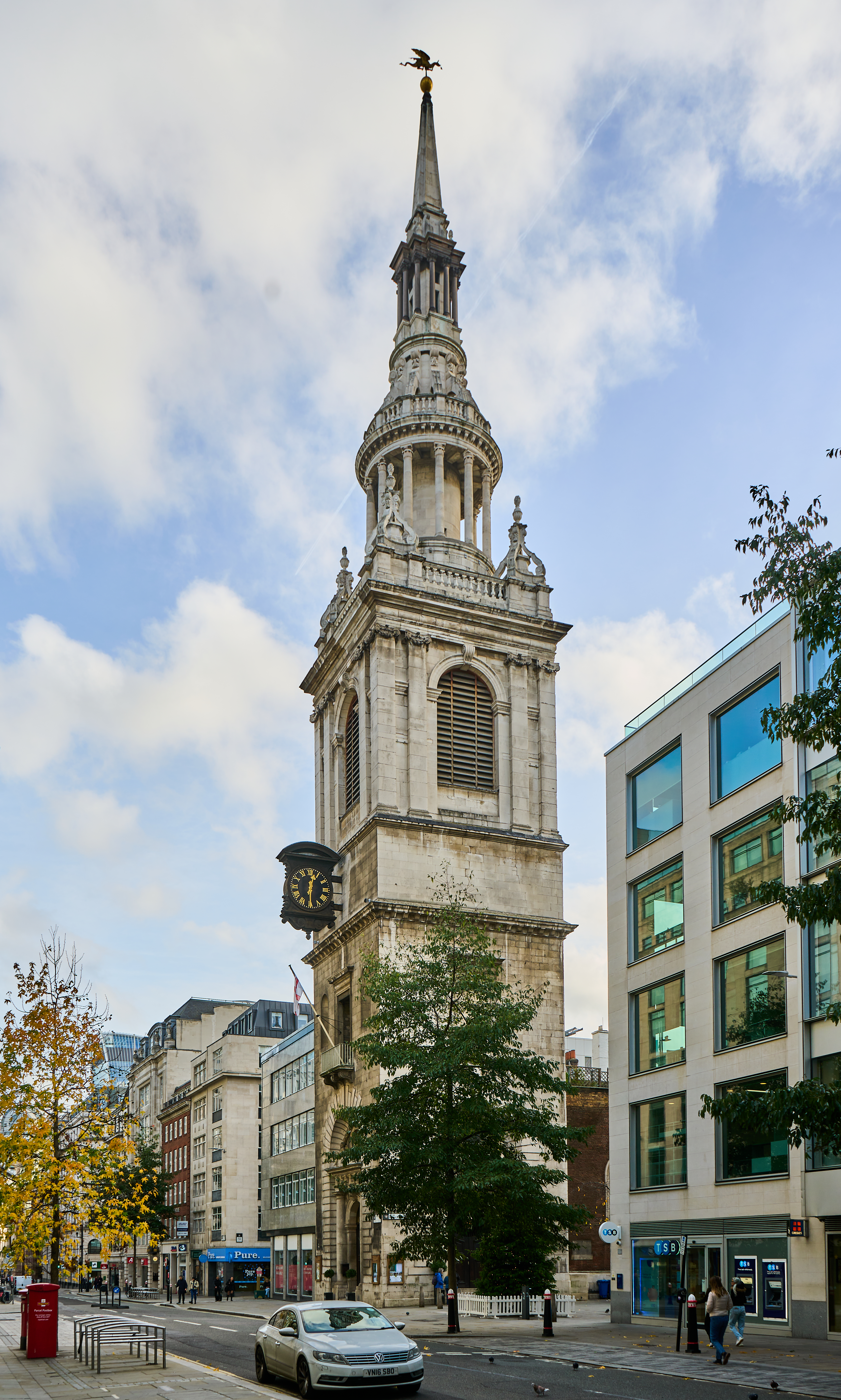
View from Cheapside in 2022

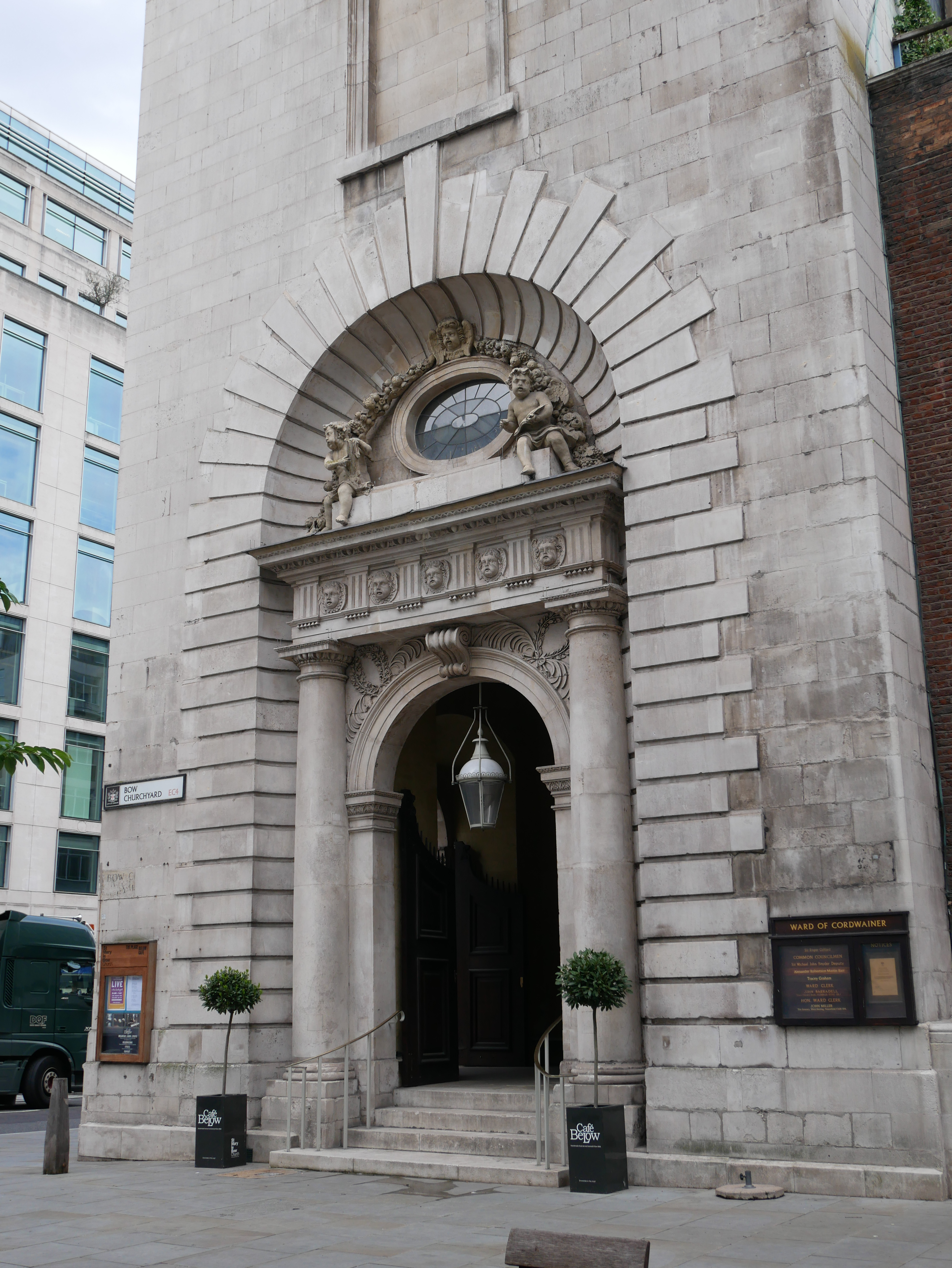
Western doorway in tower showing entablature and rustication

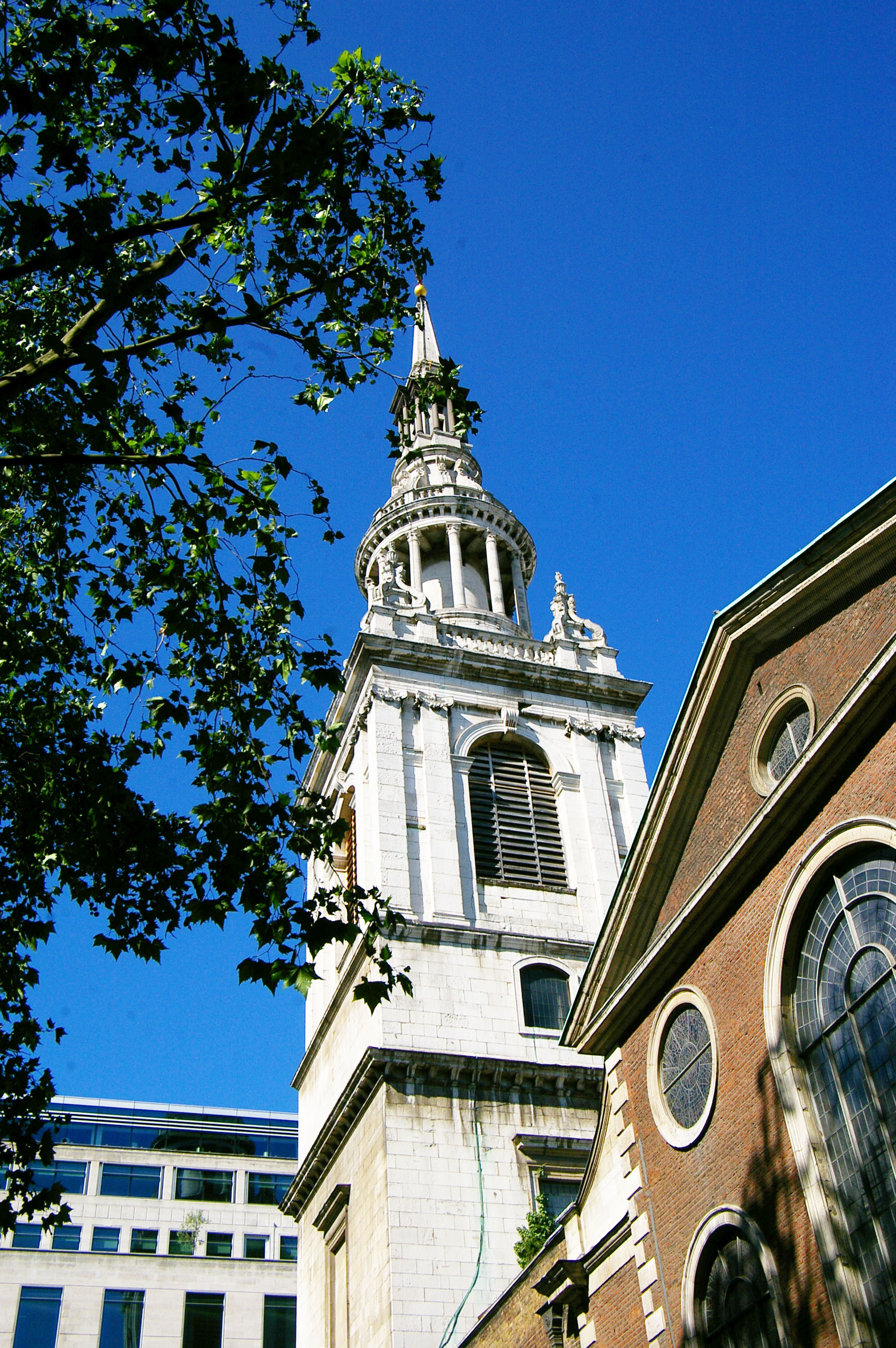
Church from the west

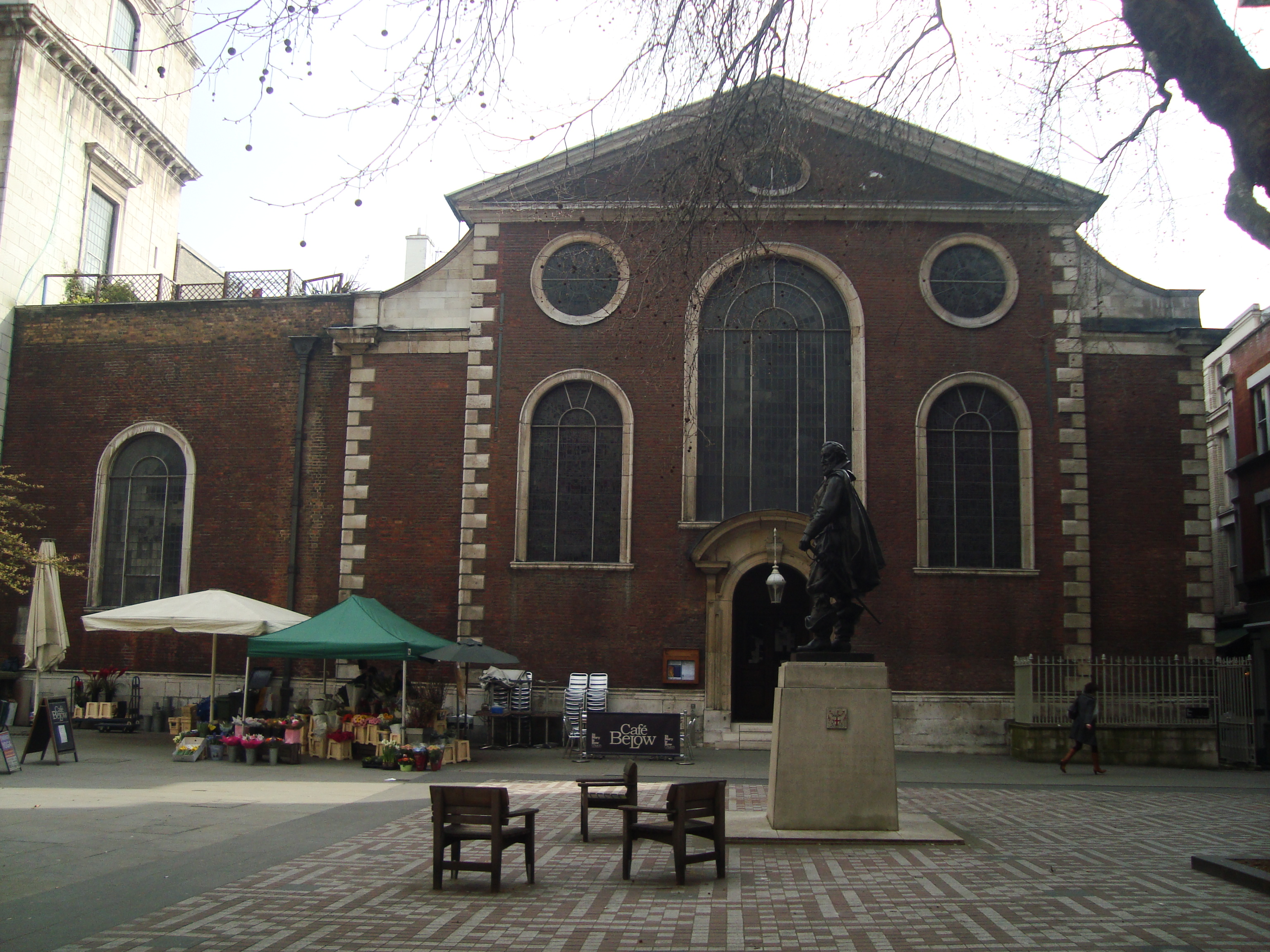
Western facade

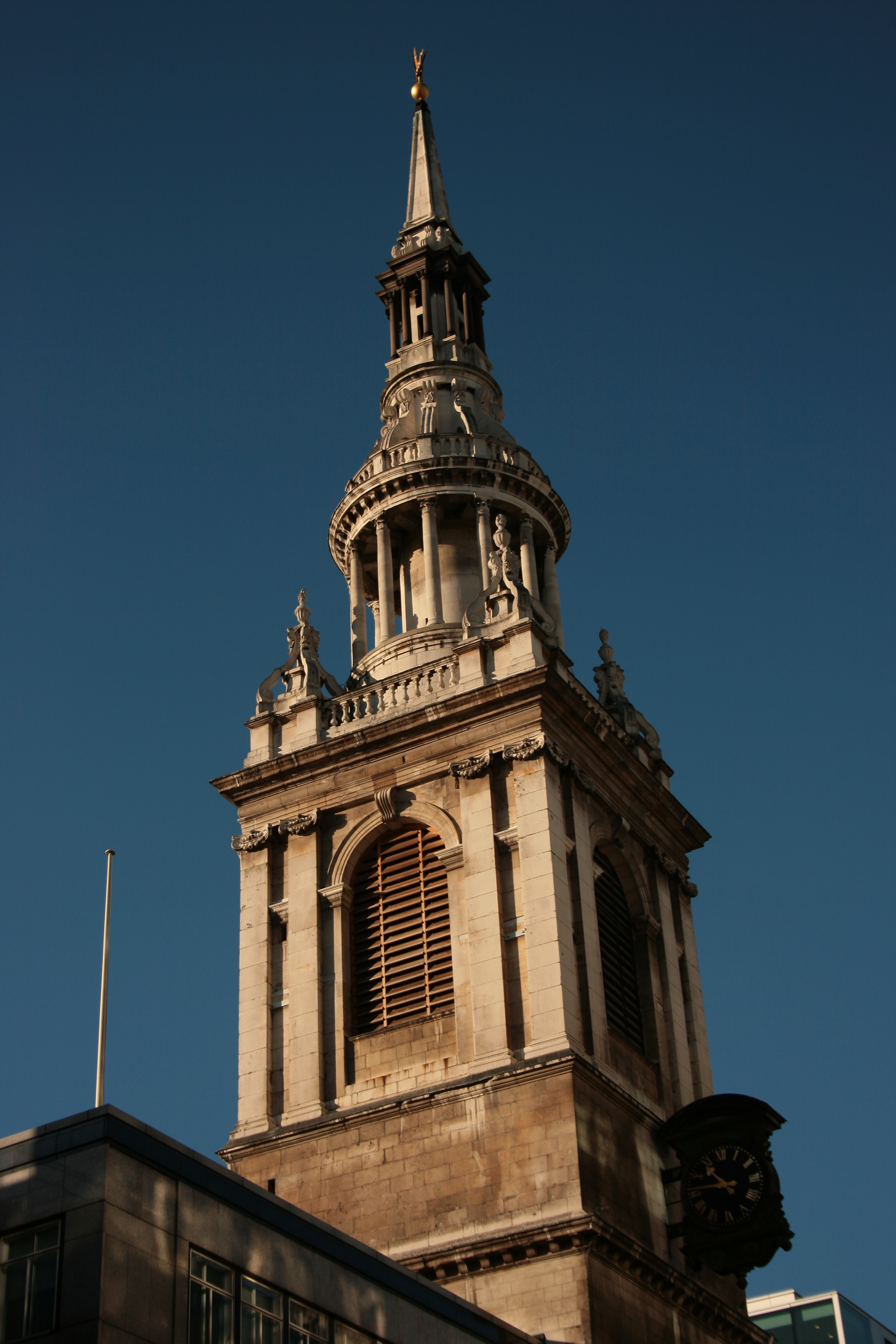
Detail on the tower and spire

=== Interior ===
Only three bays make up the nave of the church, which is divided into small aisles by large round-headed arches. These arches are supported by compound piers with attached demi-columns that feature shorter pilasters for the openings and Corinthian capitals for the nave and aisles. The tunnel vault above the nave is covered in ornamental panelling that is painted blue and white and is penetrated by the clerestory windows.

The stained glass windows are among the structure's most prominent elements. They were commissioned from John Hayward as part of the post-war rebuilding of the church and installed between 1963 and 1964. Hayward’s scheme comprises nine windows in total, five in the east wall and four in the west wall. Their modern design combines bold palettes of colour and sharp geometries with recognisable figurative iconography. In the east wall are three windows with rounded arches, the central window being taller and wider than its neighbours, which both have smaller round windows above them. Depicted across the three principal windows are the images of Christ in Majesty, flanked on either side by the Blessed Virgin Mary and St Paul. Mary is pictured cradling the church in her lap, while behind both her and Paul are 'tapestries' comprising the spires of the City of London's other churches and St Paul's Cathedral. The two smaller round windows show depictions of the sun and moon. In the west wall are two rounded-arch windows, both with smaller round windows above, that flank the entrance portal and organ. These reference the governance of the City and the heraldry of the Great Twelve Livery Companies.

Linking the church and tower is a vestibule, featuring a tall groin-vaulted stone ceiling. The top of the vault is pierced by a removable circular trapdoor, opened to allow the bells to be lowered or raised from the tower.

Beneath the church, built on almost the same floorplan, is the 11th-century crypt. The crypt, originally built as the undercroft for the church destroyed in the tornado in 1091, is three bays in length and features Norman-era round arches, some of which contain Roman bricks, and a groined vault. The crypt is now in use as the "Café Below".

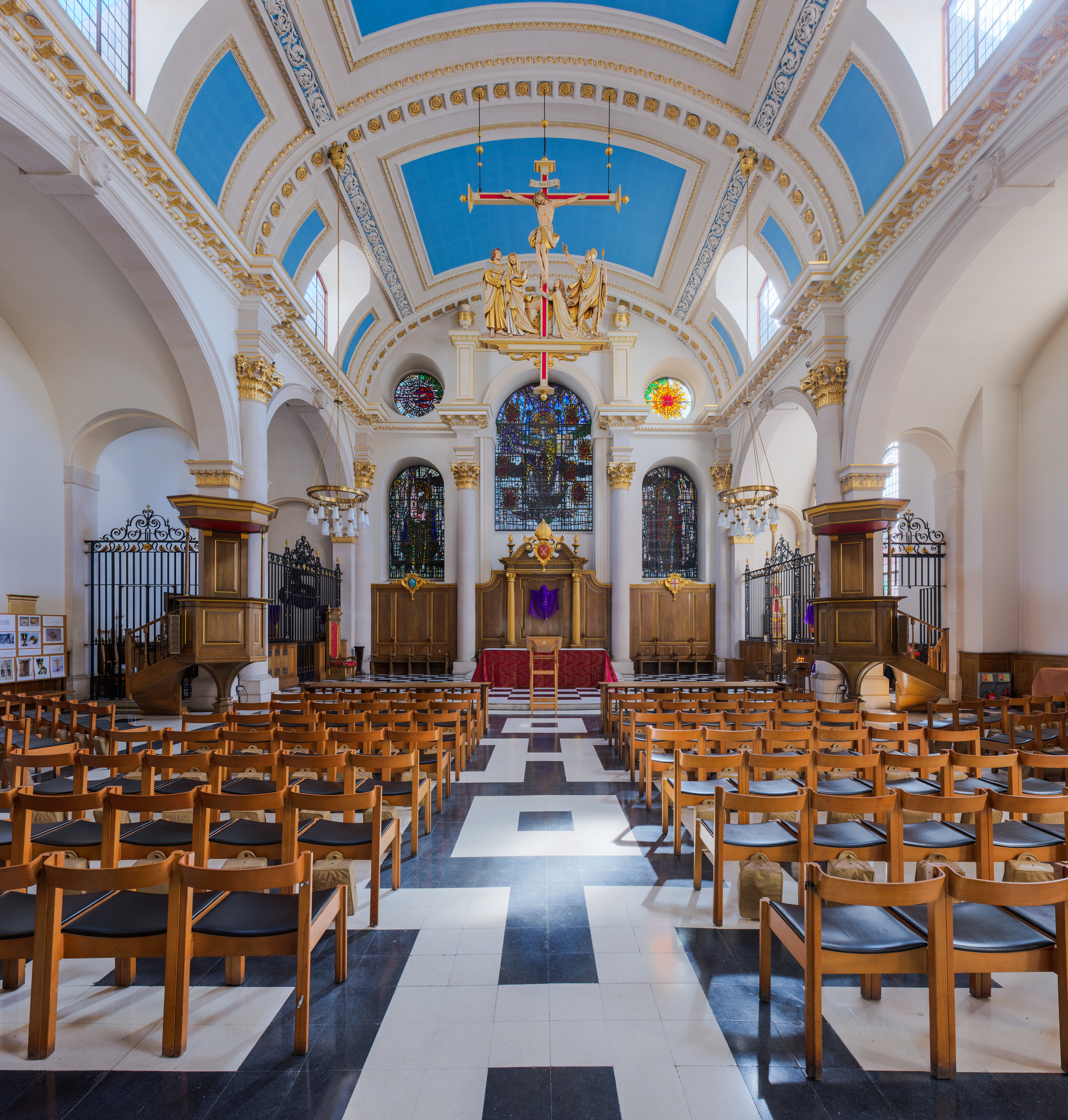
Interior, looking east

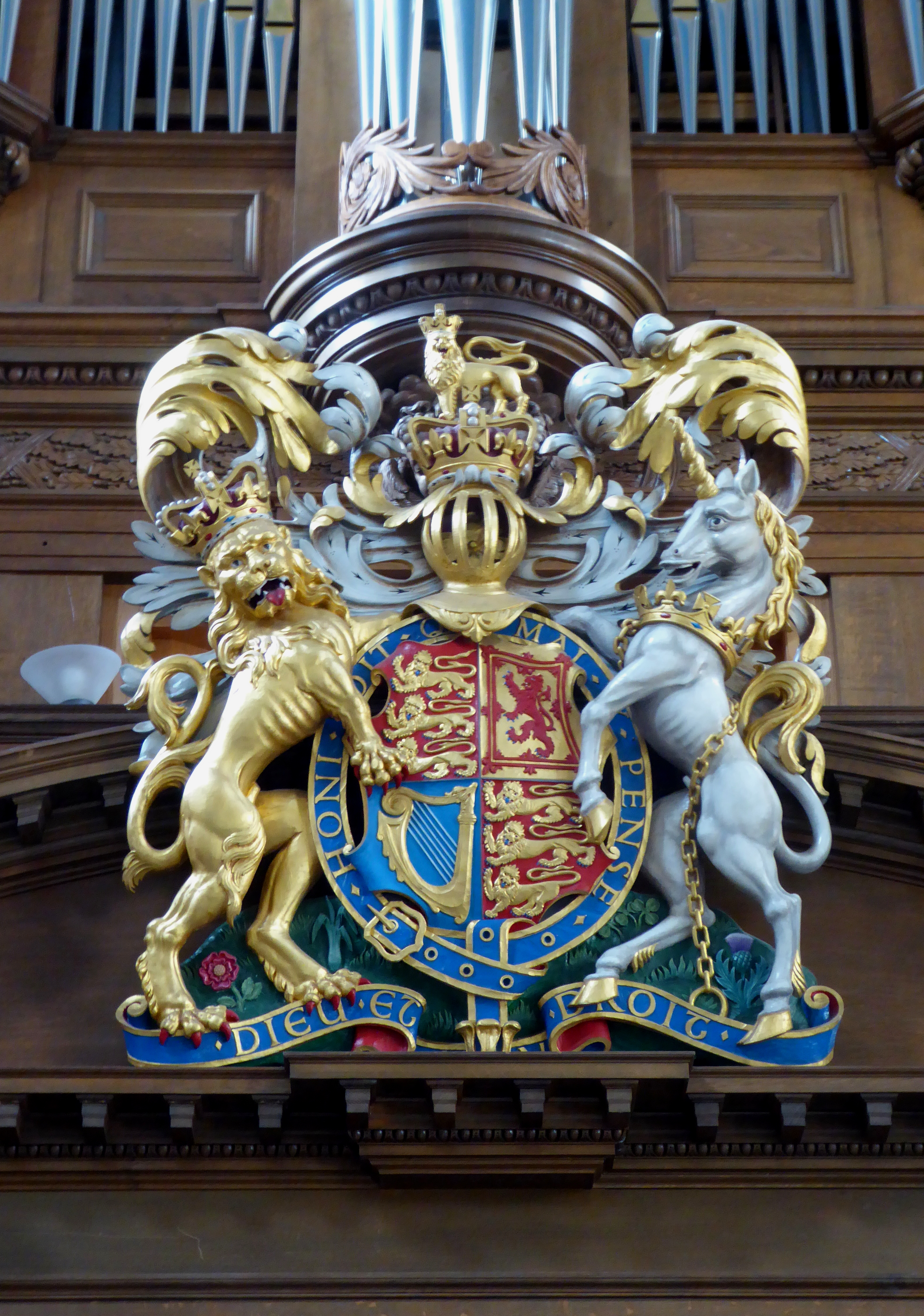
Coat of arms on the Organ gallery

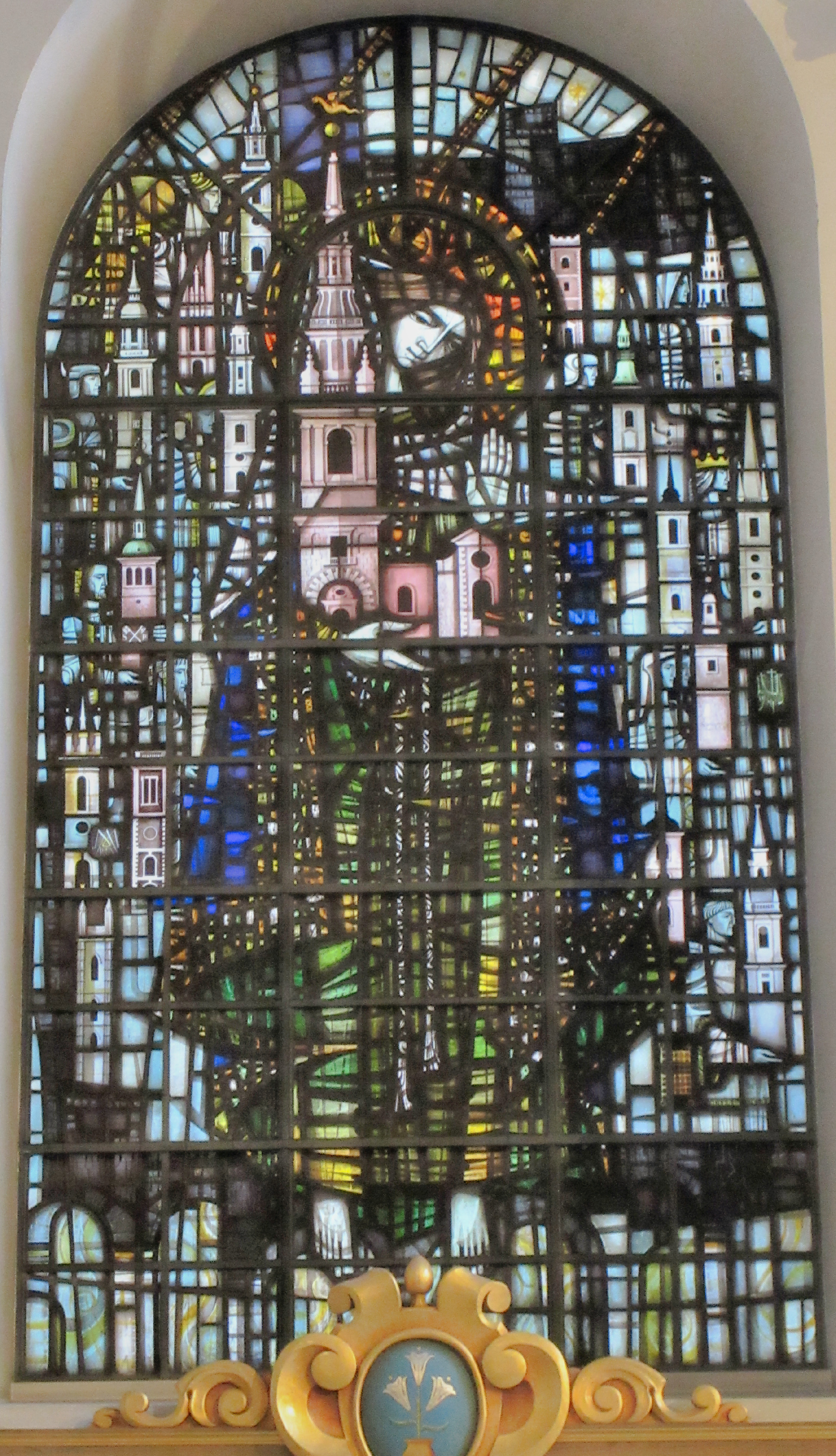
East wall, Blessed Virgin Mary window

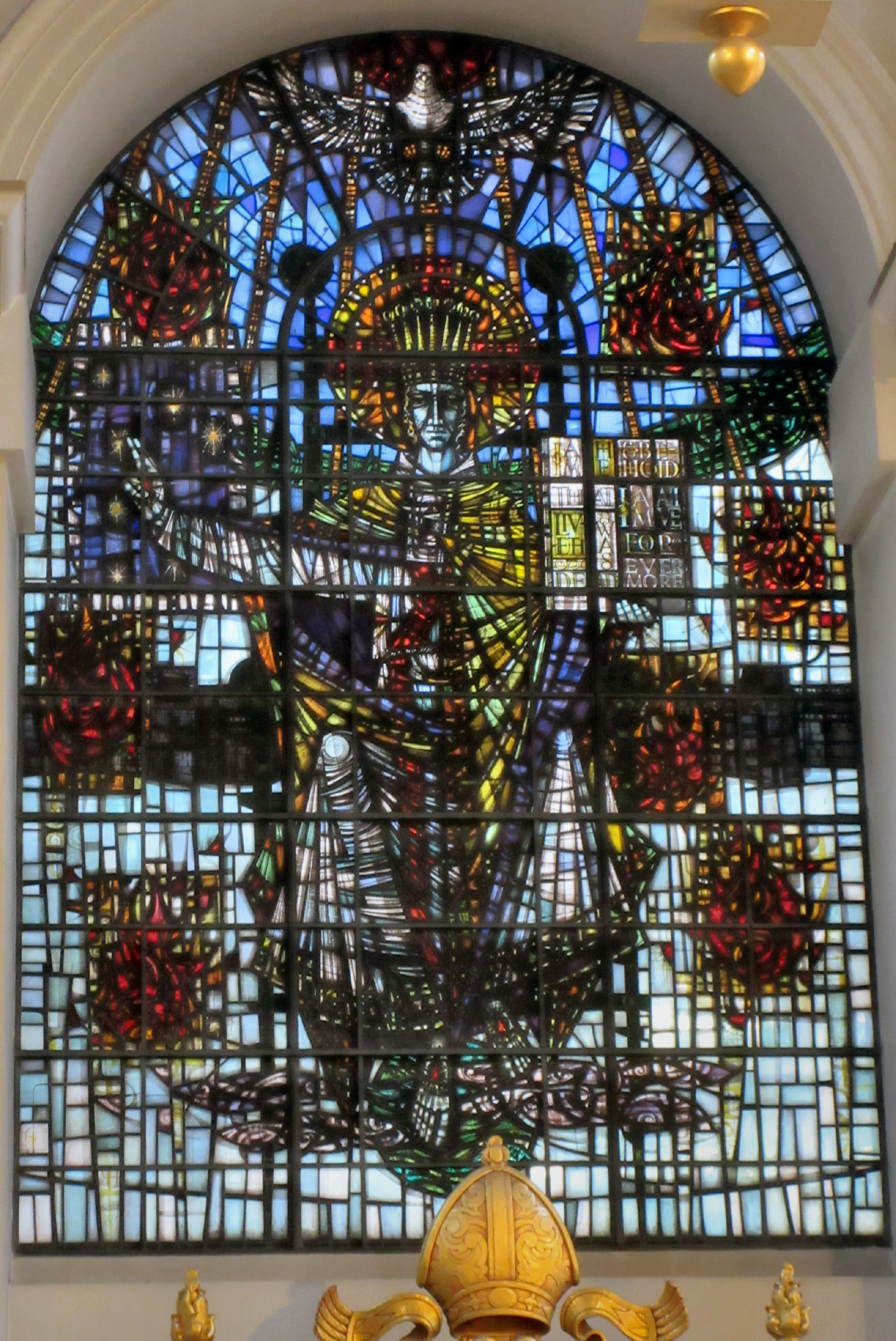
East wall, Christ in Majesty window

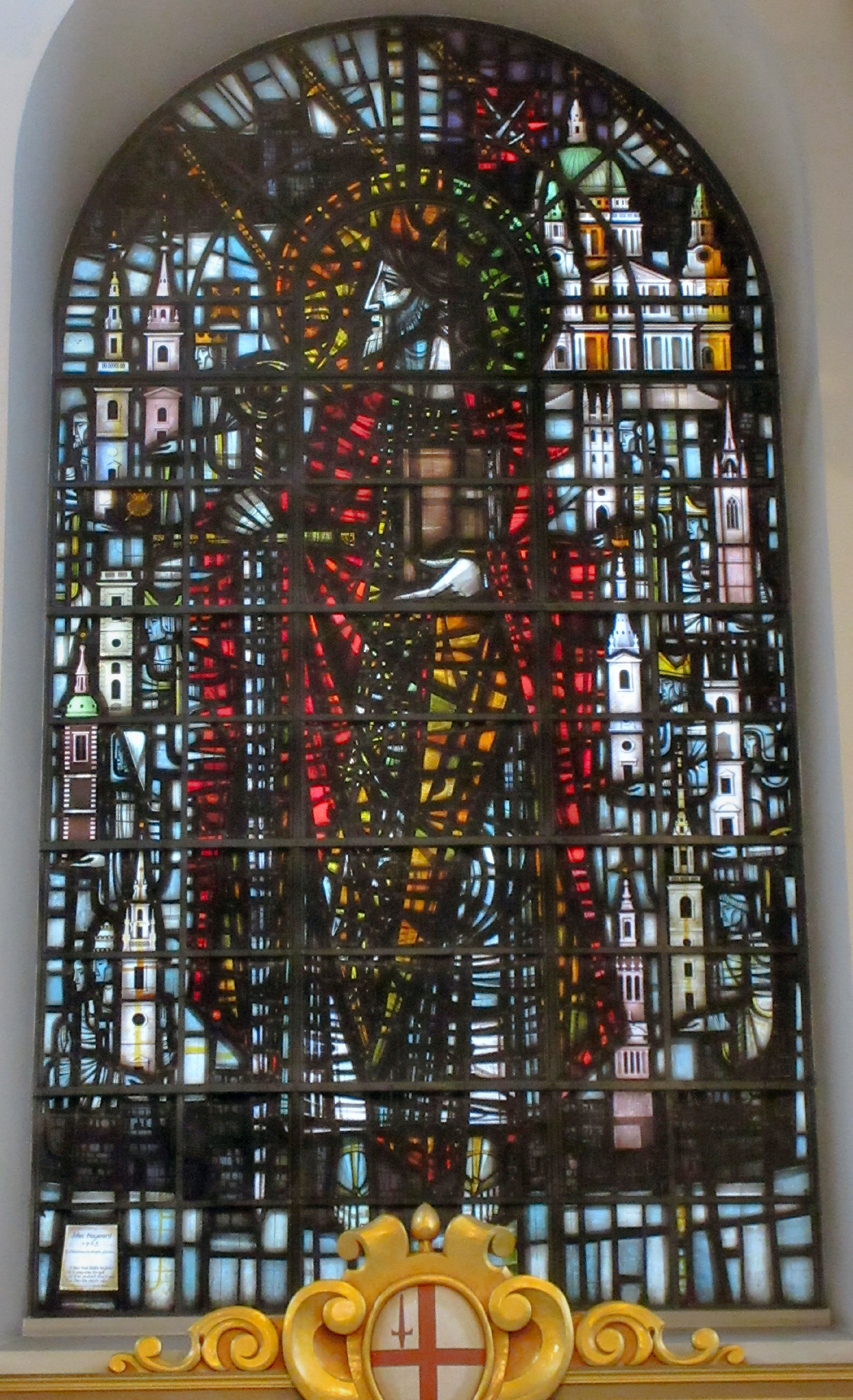
East wall, St Paul window

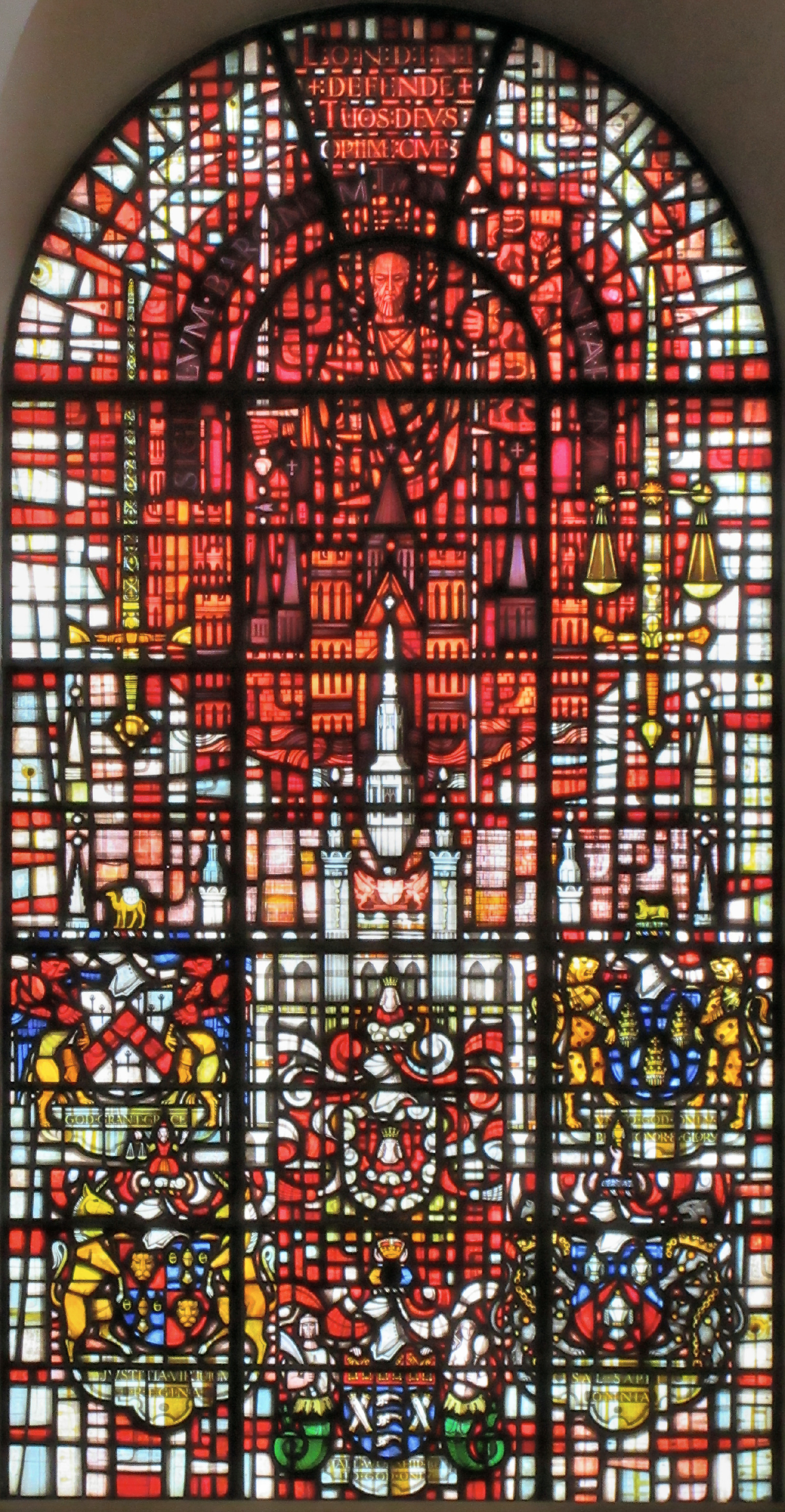
West wall window

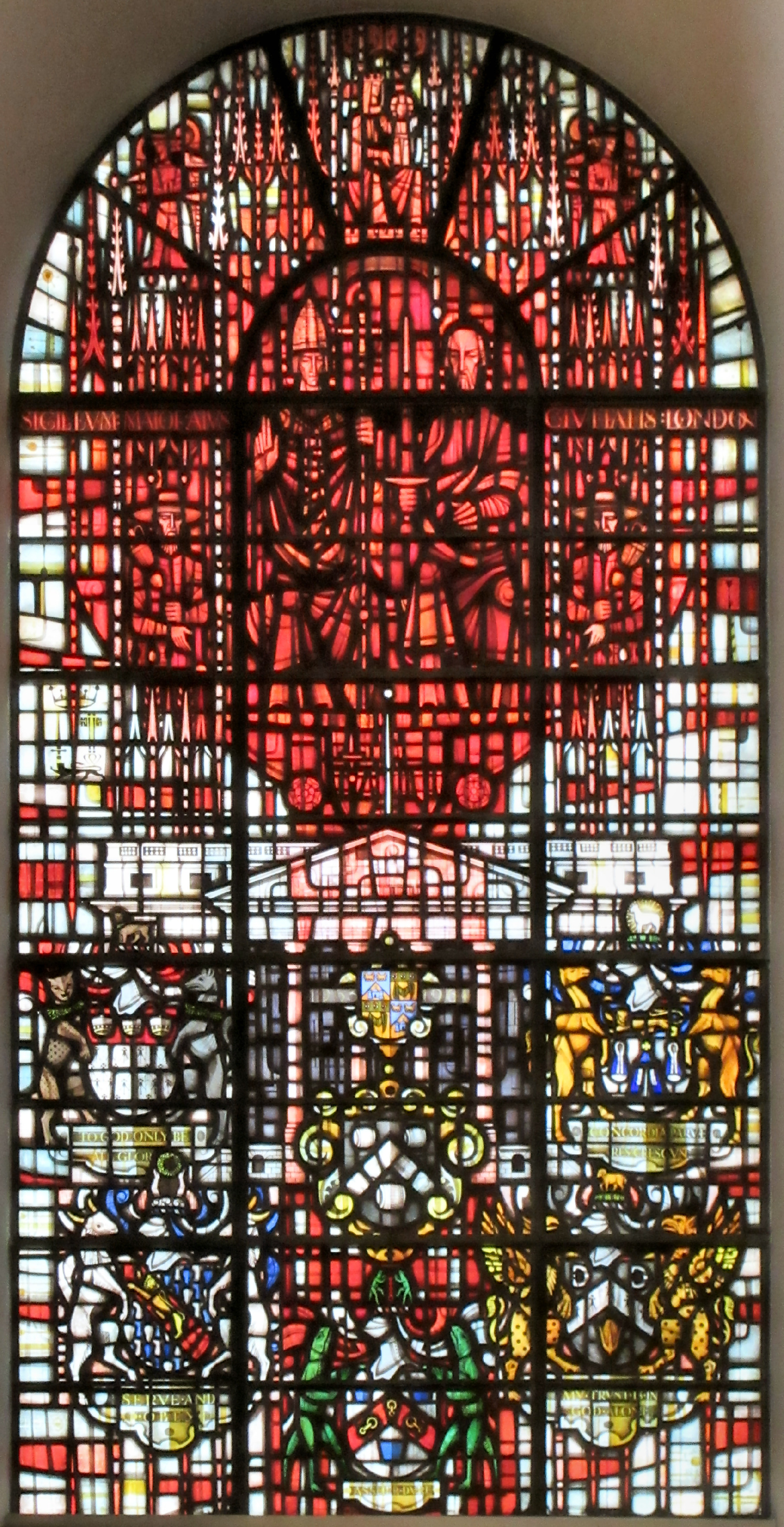
West wall window

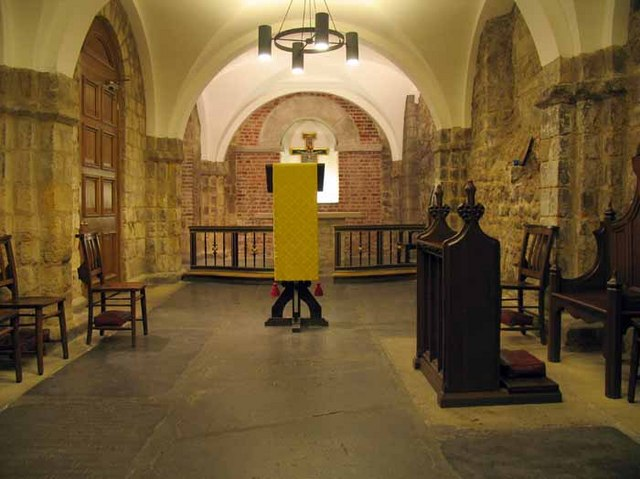
Crypt

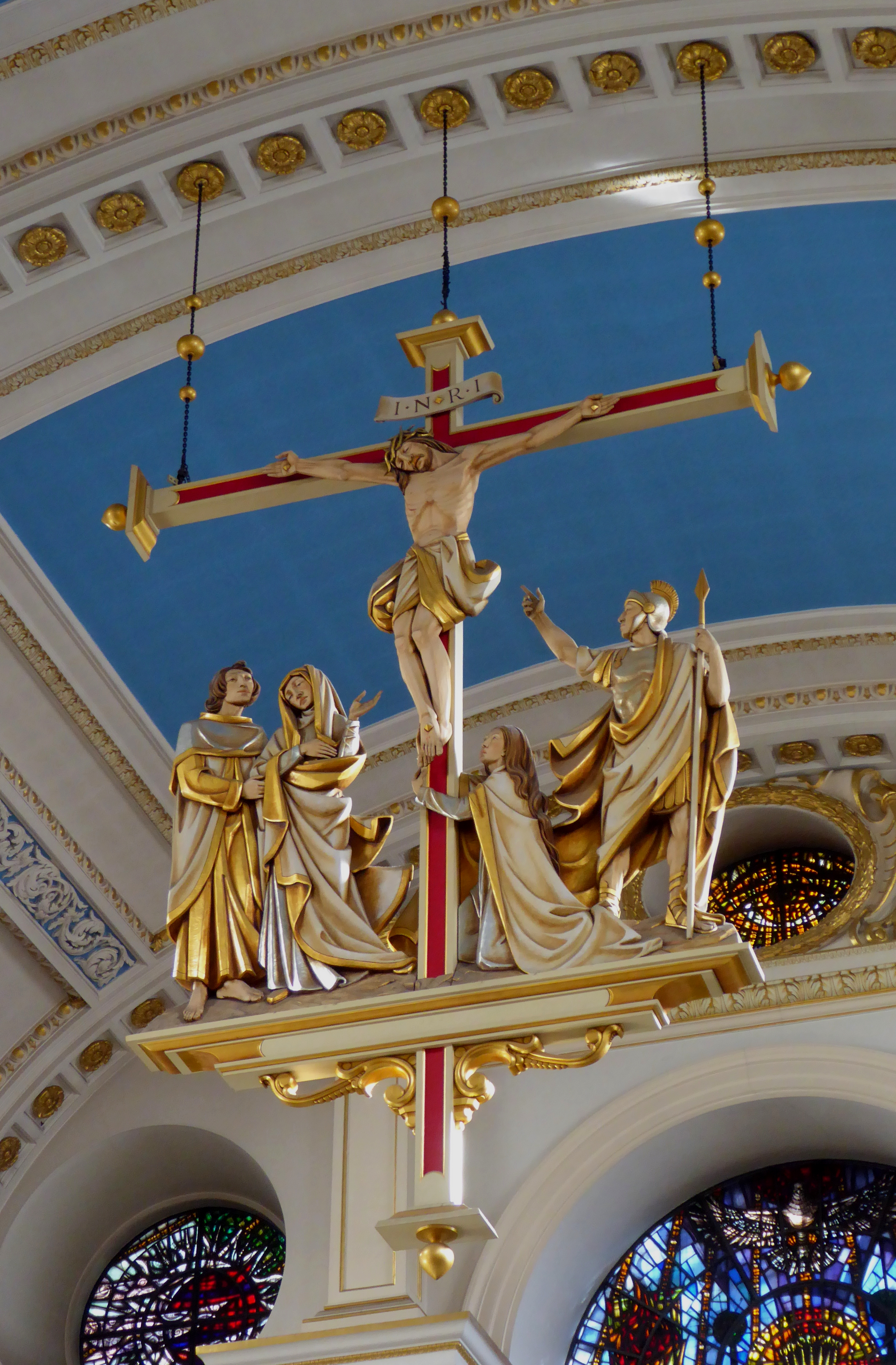
Hanging crucifix

== Music ==
=== Organ ===
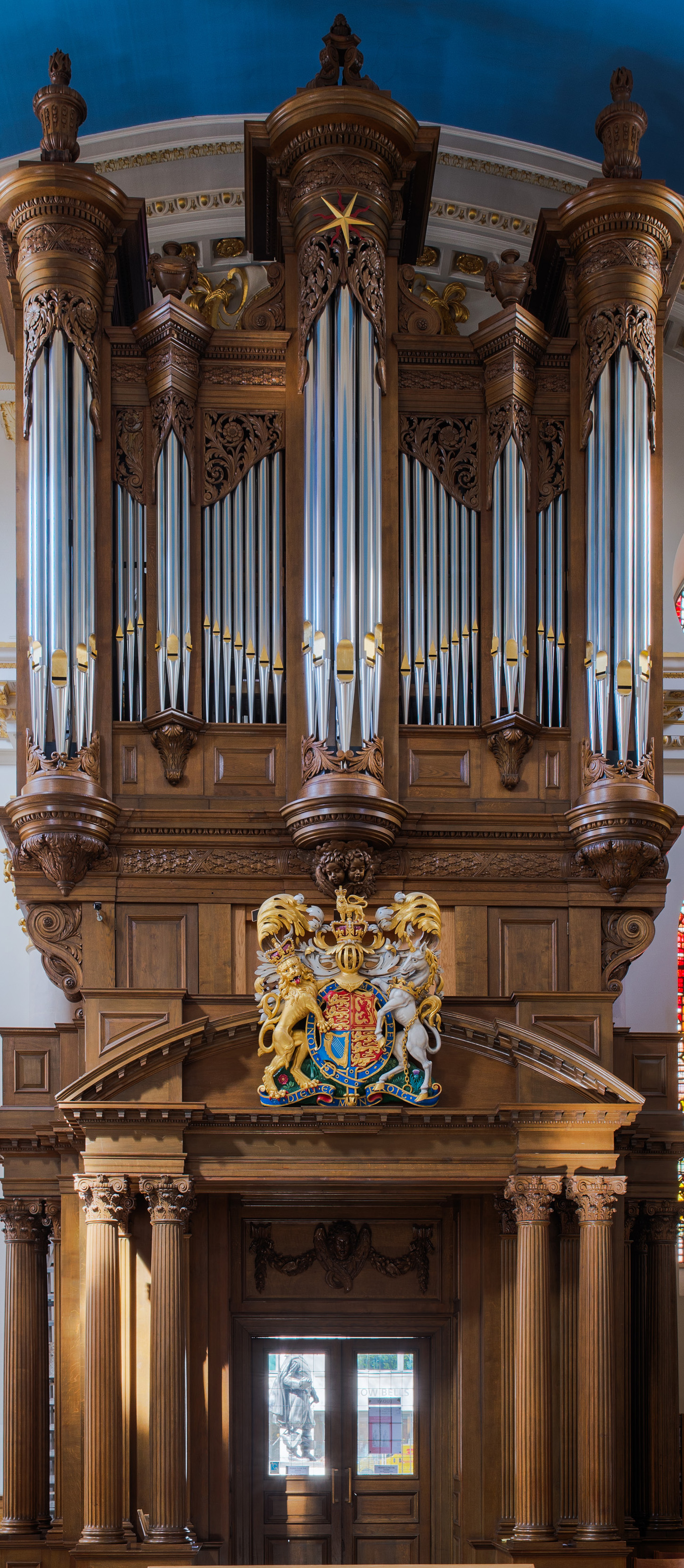
Organ, showing its position above the west gallery. The pipes date from 2010, the case from 1964

The earliest record of an organ at the church dates to 1802 when Hugh Russell of London built a small instrument formed of 13 stops and 2 manuals. This organ, like its successors, was situated on a gallery above the west doors. This organ lasted until 1867, when George Maydwell Holdich, also of London, rebuilt and enlarged the organ. He added a third manual, a pedalboard and 11 additional stops to make a total of 24.

In 1880, the organ was purchased by Walker & Sons at a cost of £255 and transferred to the Methodist Church at Thornton, Leicestershire. Walker & Sons constructed a new instrument for St Mary-le-Bow in the same year, at a cost of £1,108. This new instrument was much larger, formed of 33 stops and 3 manuals plus a pedalboard and was situated in the sanctuary at the eastern end of the church. This organ lasted unaltered until the Blitz, when following the first strike to hit the church, which only caused minor damage, it was removed for safekeeping by Rushworth and Draper.

Following the restoration of the church from 1956, the organ was remodelled in 1964. The organ was reduced in size by almost half, only 18 of the original 33 stops were reinstated and a new case designed and installed above the west door. This organ was considered by many to be a rather poor imitation of its pre-war condition but funds did not permit its replacement for 40 years.

In 2004, a project to replace the organ was launched by the church, with Kenneth Tickell & Co chosen as builders. The project, which cost £380,000, was funded by corporate and personal donors. In January 2010, the old organ was removed, though the 1964 case, based on work by the Alsace Silbermann family, was kept. The organ was completed in August 2010 and the first recital was given by Thomas Trotter on 29 September. The new organ, which reuses the old case, has 34 stops and two manuals plus pedalboard.

The church also has a small chamber organ, formed of 1 manual and with 5 stops, made by an unknown builder. It is situated in the south nave aisle.

=== Bells ===
==== History ====
===== Early bells =====
The bells at St Mary-le-Bow are often considered to be the most famous peal in the world. According to legend, Richard (Dick) Whittington heard the bells in 1392 when he left the city, calling him back and leading him to become Lord Mayor. The earliest written record of bells at the church is in 1469, when the Common Council orders a curfew bell should be rung at St Mary-le-Bow at 9.00 each evening. In 1515, William Copland, one of Henry VIII's merchants, gave money for a "great bell" to be installed, with directions it should be rung to announce the curfew. With Copland's gift, the tower then contained five bells.

In the 1552 survey of church goods ordered by Edward VI, the tower is recorded as containing five bells with two additional "sanctus" bells. These five bells would later be augmented, when in 1635, six are recorded. In 1666, during the Great Fire of London, the bells and tower, along with the church, were damaged beyond repair.

Following the Great Fire and Wren's rebuilding of the church, the tenor bell of a proposed ring of eight was cast by Christopher Hodson of St Mary Cray in 1669, placed in a temporary structure in the churchyard until the tower was completed. The bell weighed approximately 52 long cwt (2,600 kg). In 1677, Hodson cast the remaining seven and hung all eight bells in the newly completed tower in a new oak frame.

===== 18th and 19th centuries =====
No further work would take place to the bells until 1738 when the tenor bell was recast by Richard Phelps and Thomas Lester; Phelps had previously cast the hour bell at St Paul's Cathedral, called Great Tom, which still survives today. In 1762, Lester & Pack recast and rehung the other seven bells and added two more, to make a ring of ten, keeping the Hodson frame. The bells were rehung again in 1835 by Thomas Mears of Whitechapel and then a third time by Mears & Stainbank in 1863.

In 1881, Mears & Stainbank cast two new bells to augment the ring to twelve, rehanging the 3rd and 4th bells concurrently. This gave London its 5th ring of twelve, following St Bride's, Fleet Street; St Michael Cornhill; St Paul's Cathedral; and St Giles Cripplegate. In 1902, the bells needed rehanging again, with work taking place to the heaviest three bells by Gillett & Johnston of Croydon. This was evidently not successful, for the bells needed rehanging just 5 years later, the work given to Mears & Stainbank of Whitechapel again.

===== Selfridge's ring =====
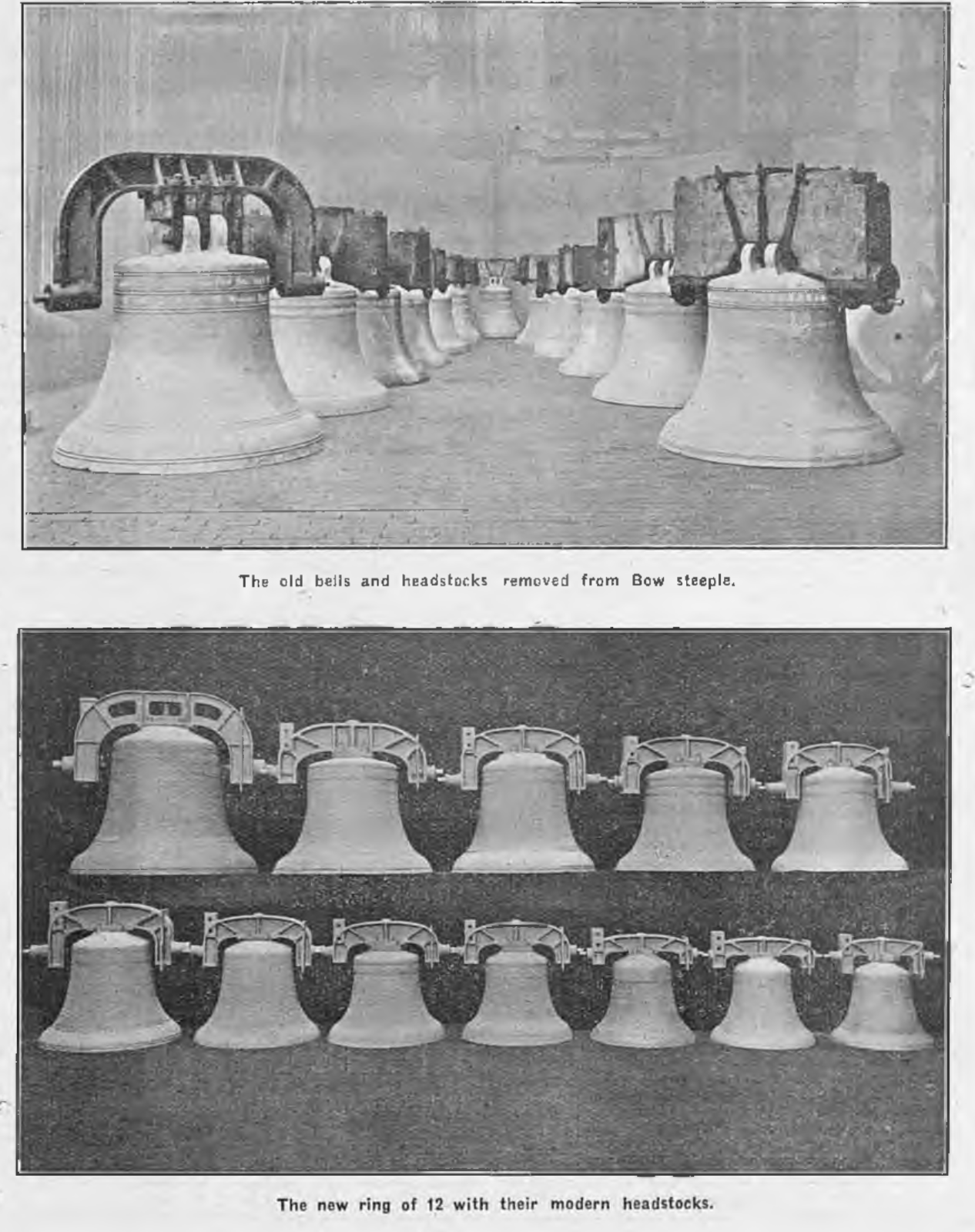
Comparison of the 1881 ring of twelve (above) and the 1933 Gillett & Johnston ring of twelve (below)

In January 1927, following the deterioration of the fittings and the condition of the tower, the bells were declared unringable in a report first published by The Times. Over the ensuing six years, much work was done to the tower and the church to restore it, but the bells remained unringable, to much public outcry. Finally, in 1933, Harry Gordon Selfridge offered to defray the cost of restoring the bells, an offer which was accepted by the church, who gave the contract to Gillett & Johnston, who Selfridge had worked with a few years previously on bells for his Oxford Street store.

The announcement that Gillett & Johnston intended to recast the tenor, which was believed to be cracked, caused so many objections that a meeting of the Province of Canterbury's ecclesiastical court was called; the decision of the court was eventually that the tenor should be recast. Gillett & Johnston found upon removing the bells to their works in Croydon that four more of the bells (6, 7, 8 and 10) were cracked, in addition to the tenor. All five cracked bells were recast in addition to the three lightest bells, leaving only the 4th, 5th, 9th and 11th from the previous ring to be retained; these four bells were retuned. The bells were rehung in their original frame with new cast iron headstocks, ball bearings and wrought iron clappers. The frame was substantially strengthened with a massive concrete and steel grillage weighing 3.5 long tonnes (3,556 kg). The bells were rededicated by the Archbishop of Canterbury on 7 July 1933.

Shortly after their installation, the BBC World Service recorded the bells for use as a time signal, which brought the attention of the bells to a global audience; the recording survives today. On the night of 10 May 1941, the church was struck by several incendiary bombs. Though the tower was spared a direct hit, the flames from the body of the church were fanned into the tower, which acted like a furnace, destroying all of the internal floors and the frame, causing the bells to crash over 100 feet (30 m) to the ground, irrevocably damaging them.

===== Post-war restoration =====
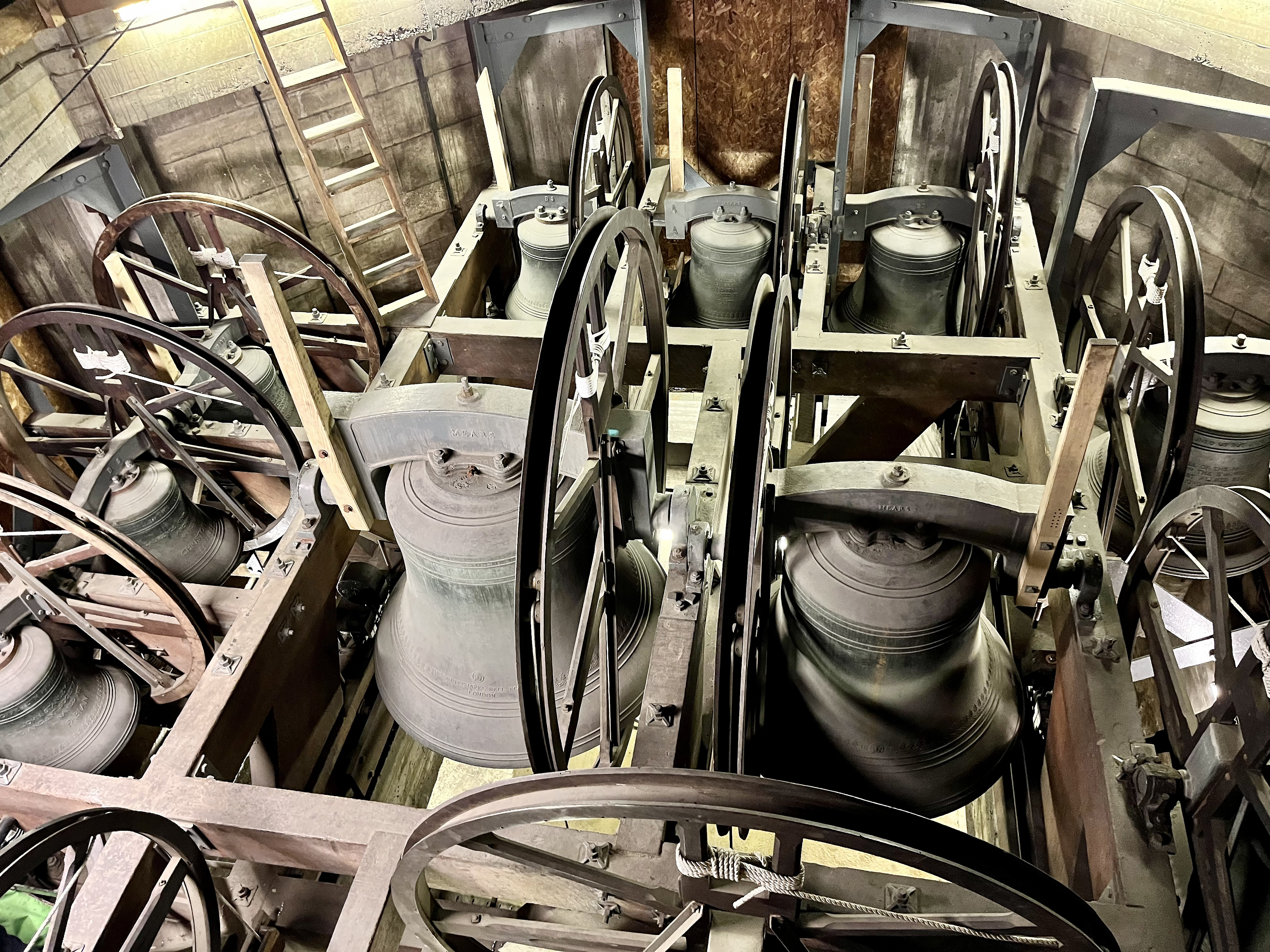
The present ring of bells, with the Great Bell of Bow centre left

The damaged bells were removed shortly after their destruction to Mears & Stainbank's foundry in Whitechapel, but they remained in storage for more than 10 years. In 1956, as the restoration of the church began, attention turned to the restoration of the tower and the recasting of the bells. Much of the cost of restoring the tower and bells was met by the Bernard Sunley Charitable Foundation and Trinity Church, Wall Street, New York City. A new ring of twelve was cast by Mears & Stainbank in 1956, partially reusing metal salvaged from the 1933 ring. However, due to the condition of the tower, which required repairs, the bells were not hung until late 1961.

The bells were dedicated in the presence of Prince Philip, Duke of Edinburgh by Robert Stopford, Bishop of London, on 21 December 1961. The tenor was tolled by Prince Philip at the beginning of the service. The bells were hung in a new frame, made of Javanese Jang (Dipterocarpus terminatus). Since then, the bells have been frequently rung, both by members of the Ancient Society of College Youths who reside in or near the city, and by visiting bands of ringers, who come from across the world to ring the bells.

All the bells are named and each bell has an inscription from the Book of Psalms and Gospel of Luke, the first letter of each forming the acrostic "D. Whittington". The largest bell weighs 41 long cwt 3 qrs 21 lb (4,697 lb or 2,131 kg), the third heaviest tenor bell in London after St Paul's and Southwark Cathedral.

==== Specification ====
Bells of St Mary-le-Bow, Cheapside, EC2
No.	Name	Weight (cwt-qrs-lbs)	Weight (kg and lb)	Note	Diameter (inches)	Acrostic text
1	Katherine	5-3-21	302 kg (666 lb)	G	27 3/4	Ps 96: "Declare his glory among the heathen…"
2	Fabian	5-3-10	297 kg (655 lb)	F	29	Ps 50: "Whoso offereth praise glorifieth me…"
3	Christopher	6-1-7	321 kg (708 lb)	E	30	Ps 148: "His name alone is excellent…"
4	Margaret	6-2-17	338 kg (745 lb)	D	32	Ps 29: "In his temple doth every one speak of His glory."
5	Mildred	7-3-27	406 kg (895 lb)	C	34	Ps 104: "The glory of the Lord shall endure forever"
6	Faith	8-3-27	457 kg (1,008 lb)	B	35	Ps 138: "They will sing of the ways of the Lord…"
7	Augustine	10-0-20	517 kg (1,140 lb)	A	38	Ps 145: "I will speak of the glorious honour of thy majesty."
8	John	12-1-11	627 kg (1,382 lb)	G	41	Ps 115: "Not unto us, O Lord, not unto us, but unto thy name give glory."
9	Timothy	17-3-17	909 kg (2,004 lb)	F	46	Ps 29: "Give unto the Lord the glory due unto his name…"
10	Pancras	21-2-23	1,103 kg (2,432 lb)	E	49	Ps 145: "Thy saints shall bless thee."
11	Cuthbert	29-1-5	1,488 kg (3,280 lb)	D	5	Ps 86: "O Lord my God, I will glorify Your name forevermore."
12	Bow	41-3-21	2,131 kg (4,698 lb)	C	61 1/4	Lk 2: "Now lettest thou thy servant depart in peace…"
All bells have the Whitechapel Bell Foundry roundel cast upon them, together with the date of their recasting (1956).

==== In popular culture ====
The bells, often considered amongst the most famous in the world, have typically been used to define whether or not one is a true Londoner or Cockney; anyone born within their earshot is considered such. With the urbanisation of the City of London in the 20th and 21st centuries, the increasing population, noise pollution and the soundproofing measures installed in the belfry, the range of the Bow bells is significantly smaller than at its peak.

In 1851, the bells could be heard across north and east London, as far as Hackney Marshes, Stratford and Limehouse, with reports that they could also be heard south of the Thames in Southwark. An acoustic study taken in 2012 shows that this range has shrunk substantially, and is now confined to the eastern parts of the Square Mile and Shoreditch. With no maternity hospitals within this range and only limited residential properties, arguably the modern chance of the birth of a "true" cockney is now very low.

The bells are also mentioned in the nursery rhyme "Oranges and Lemons": "I do not know, says the Great Bell of Bow".

Ordinarily, distances by road from London are now measured from Charing Cross but, before the late 18th century, they were measured from the London Stone in Cannon Street, or the Standard in Cornhill. However, on the road from London to Lewes, the mileage is taken from the church door of St Mary-le-Bow. To note the reference point used, mileposts along the way are marked with the rebus in cast-iron of a bow and four bells.

The church is also mentioned in the song "The London Boys" by David Bowie ("… Bow Bell strikes another night…").

The West Ham United F.C. away shirt for the 2024/25 season features a graphic representation of the St Mary-le-Bow woven into the fabric along with a reference to the church's bells on the back of the neck.

=== The Academy of St Mary-le-Bow ===
The Academy of St Mary-le-Bow, a London-based chamber orchestra founded in 2016, is the resident orchestra at St Mary-le-Bow. It gave its debut concert at the church in August 2016 and continues to present regular performances there.

== Services ==
St Mary-le-Bow ministers to the financial industry and livery companies of the City of London. Consequently, services are held on weekdays rather than the more traditional Sunday morning. Services generally consist of two sessions of 15 minute prayer, one at 8.30 am and another at 5.45 pm on every weekday. These are supplemented by two more formal services of Eucharist, one on a Wednesday lunchtime at 1.05 pm and the second on a Thursday evening at 6.05pm.
