= Christopher Hodson (bellfounder) =

English bellfounder (died c. 1696)

Christopher Hodson (died c. 1696) was an English bellfounder from London, who was active between 1669 and 1696.

During the 17th century the Hodson’s foundry rivalled that of the more famous Whitechapel foundry. It appears to have been started by John Hodson by or before 1654, the date of the first known Hodson bell. By 1669 Christopher's name starts to appear, presumably John’s son. For a while the two worked together and bells from this period bear the legend “John and Christopher Hodson”. In 1677, however, Christopher started a branch business in St. Mary Cray and bells cast there just have "Christopher Hodson" on them. Christopher’s name disappears after 1687.

In part due to the difficulties of transporting heavy objects, it was not uncommon at this date for bellfounders to travel to the work. An instance of when Hodson did this is documented at Durham Cathedral. In 1693 the cathedral employed Hodson to recast their bells into a ring of eight (tenor: 28 long cwt 0 qr 6 lb (3,142 lb or 1,425 kg), 54.63 inches (1,388 mm) in D). Not only was he a bellfounder; at Durham he fixed the wheels and installed the ringing mechanism as well as casting the bells.

While at Durham he cast the bells for some other churches in the locality. A report in 1979 of a "recent" archaeological excavation within the cathedral precincts revealed the pit where the bells were cast. Also recovered was part of a mould for St. Oswald's for which Hodson cast a ring of 6 in 1694. Two of the bells cast by Christopher Hodson are on display at St Oswald's Church, Durham.

Little is known of the Hodsons' personal lives. The parish registers for St. Mary Cray record the baptism of "Christopher, the sonne of Christopher Hodgson [sic]" on 1 October 1677. Two burial entries exist: on 16 May 1679 "Hugh, son of Mr. Xtopher Hodson," and on 20 May 1687 "Susan Smythe, y^{e} daughter of Mr. Ch^{r} Hodgson,".

As of 2023 40 of his bells are extant, of which 15 are listed for preservation. Some of Hodson's bells have been subsequently recast, so the number he produced is higher than the 40 extant ones. (Note: For example see Rochester Cathedral where two earlier bells were recast by Hodson in 1683 but subsequently recast again in 1834 and 1904.)

He cast several notable sets of bells, including Great Tom of Oxford (124.5 long cwt (13,900 lb or 6,300 kg) diameter 20.5 inches (520 mm) in G), and the bells for the Chapel at Merton College, also in Oxford, which are known as the oldest peal of bells in the United Kingdom which were cast by one founder (tenor 25 long cwt 1 qr 10 lb (2,838 lb or 1,287 kg), diameter 52.5 inches (1,330 mm) in E♭). The bells are also noted for their rather unusual ringing room; a gallery snaking around the inside of the tower.
