= List of universities in Singapore =

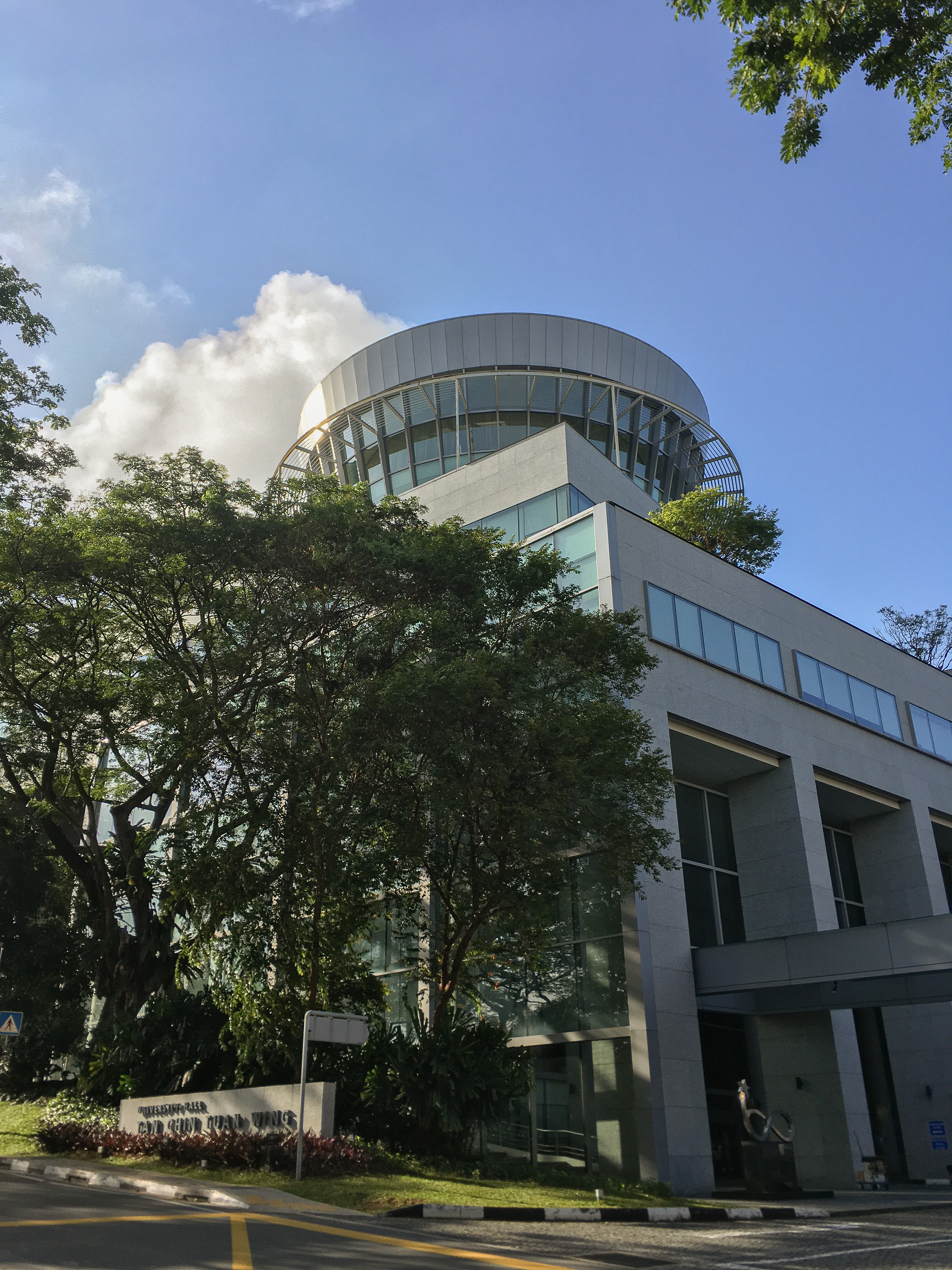
National University of Singapore, with a history dating back to 1905, is the oldest university in Singapore

This is a list of universities in Singapore. The oldest university in Singapore is the National University of Singapore, which was established in its current form in 1980, but has a history in tertiary education dating back to 1905. The university along with the Nanyang Technological University are research intensive and rank the highest in global university ranking publications.

Newer universities have been established by the government since 2000 that specialise in various sectors and in applied learning. Singapore also has partnered and directly-operated campuses from foreign universities and other private institutions offering external degree programs from overseas institutions.

== Publicly-funded local universities ==
=== Current ===
Singapore has seven publicly-funded universities. Six of them are gazetted as autonomous universities, with the exception of the University of the Arts Singapore. Dates starred with an asterisk are the earliest antecedent institution.

University	Abbreviation	Type	Established	QS rank	ARWU rank	THE rank	US News rank	CWTS rank
National University of Singapore	NUS	Research intensive autonomous university	1905*	8	71	17	22	38
Nanyang Technological University	NTU	Research intensive autonomous university	1981*	12	93	30	27	86
Singapore Management University	SMU	Research intensive autonomous university	2000	511	N/A	N/A	577	N/A
Singapore University of Social Sciences	SUSS	Autonomous university of applied learning	2005*	N/A	N/A	N/A	N/A	N/A
Singapore Institute of Technology	SIT	Autonomous university of applied learning	2009	N/A	N/A	N/A	N/A	N/A
Singapore University of Technology and Design	SUTD	Research intensive autonomous university	2009	519	901-1000	N/A	302	1177
University of the Arts Singapore	UAS	Collegiate university of the arts	2023	N/A	N/A	N/A	N/A	N/A

Location of public universities in Singapore

=== Defunct ===
University	Type	Established	Defunct	Comments
Nanyang University	Private university	1956	1980	Defunct following merger with University of Singapore to form NUS
SIM University	Private university	2005	2017	Defunct following restructuring to form SUSS

== Foreign institutions ==
Foreign institutions are regulated by the Committee for Private Education (CPE). There are various accreditation and rating processes in Singapore including the EduTrust Certification Scheme. Below is an incomplete list of institutions of higher learning that offer undergraduate and/or graduate programmes in Singapore.

=== Local campuses of foreign universities ===
The following private education institutions are local branches of foreign universities. Institutions are listed alphabetically in the order of country of origin and dates starred with an asterisk are the earliest antecedent institution.

Country	University	Type	Type	Estab.	QS rank	ARWU rank	Times rank	US News rank	CWTS rank
Australia	Curtin University	Comprehensive	Private campus of public university	1900*	174	201-300	201–250	160	310
Australia	James Cook University	Comprehensive	Private campus of public university	1961*	445	301-400	351–400	324	698
Australia	The University of Newcastle	Postgraduate	Private subsidiary of public university	1951*	179	401-500	201-250	231	388
France	Paris-Panthéon-Assas University	Specialised	Private law school of non-profit university	1100*	851-900	N/A	N/A	N/A	N/A

=== Foreign universities operating under partnership with local universities ===
The following education institutions are operated under a partnership with local universities. Institutions are listed alphabetically in the order of country of origin. Dates starred with an asterisk are the earliest antecedent institution.

Country	University	Abbrev.	Partner	Estab.	QS rank	ARWU rank	Times rank	US News rank	CWTS rank
Germany	Technical University of Munich	TUM Asia	Singapore Institute of Technology	1868*	28	59	30	79	102
Switzerland	Singapore-ETH Centre	SEC	Singapore National Research Foundation	1855	N/A	N/A	N/A	N/A	N/A
United Kingdom	Newcastle University	NUiS	Singapore Institute of Technology	1834*	129	201-300	168	156	292
United Kingdom	University of Glasgow	UGS	Singapore Institute of Technology	1451	78	101-150	87	74	263
United States	DigiPen Institute of Technology	DigiPen	Singapore Institute of Technology	1988	N/A	N/A	N/A	N/A	N/A
United States	Duke-NUS Medical School	Duke-NUS	National University of Singapore	2005	N/A	501-600	N/A	N/A	N/A
United States	The Culinary Institute of America	CIA	Singapore Institute of Technology	1954	N/A	N/A	N/A	N/A	N/A
United States	Yale-NUS College (closed since 2025)	Yale-NUS	National University of Singapore	2011	N/A	N/A	N/A	N/A	N/A

=== Local campuses of business schools and other institutions ===
This is a list of some non-local business schools and other institutions operating in Singapore.

Country	University	Abbreviation	Type	Established
Switzerland	St. Gallen Institute of Management in Asia (University of St. Gallen)	SGI-HSG	Public research intensive autonomous university	1898
France	ESSEC Business School	ESSEC	Private non-profit business school	1907
France	INSEAD Asia Campus	INSEAD	Private non-profit business school	1957
India	S P Jain School of Global Management	SPJAIN	Private business school	2004
Switzerland	EHL Hospitality Business School	EHL	Private non-profit hospitality school	1893

== Private external degree providers ==
The following private education institutions offer external degree programmes (EDPs) with undergraduate and postgraduate degrees conferred by the institutions' partner universities.

Institution	Awarding body
Amity Global Institute	University of London; University of Northampton; Teesside University
Auston Institute of Management	University of the West of England
BAC College (Singapore)	University of London
Beacon International College	Cardiff Metropolitan University; University of East London
DIMENSIONS International College	Cardiff Metropolitan University; University of Derby; Wrexham University
East Asia Institute of Management (EAIM)	Aston University; Cardiff Metropolitan University; De Montfort University; University of Essex; Herriot-Watt University; Queen Margaret University; Sheffield Hallam University
ERC Institute	Embry-Riddle Aeronautical University; University of Chichester; University of Greenwich
Kaplan Higher Education Academy	Birmingham City University, Monash University; Murdoch University; Northumbria University; RMIT University, Royal Holloway, University of London; University College Dublin; University of Essex; University of Portsmouth
London School of Business & Finance	Manchester Metropolitan University; University of East London; University of Greenwich
Management Development Institute of Singapore	Bangor University; Edinburgh Napier University; Leeds Beckett University; Northumbria University; University of Central Oklahoma; University of Roehampton; University of Sunderland; Teesside University
Nanyang Institute of Management	Abertay University; University of the West of Scotland; York St John University
PSB Academy	Coventry University; Edinburgh Napier University; Edith Cowan University; La Trobe University; Massey University; The University of Newcastle, Australia; University of Canberra; University of Hertfordshire; University of Nottingham
Raffles College of Higher Education	Coventry University
SISH Institute	University of West London
Singapore Institute of Management	La Trobe University; RMIT University; State University of New York at Buffalo; University of Birmingham; University of London; University of Stirling; University of Sydney; University of Warwick; University of Wollongong
Singapore Raffles Music College	University of West London; University for the Creative Arts
TMC Academy	University of Northampton

== See also ==
- Education in Singapore
- List of schools in Singapore
- Lists of universities and colleges by country
