= 2019 University of Essex anti-semitism controversy =

Discrimination scandal in England

The 2019 University of Essex anti-semitism controversy relates to events in February 2019, where more than 200 students at the University of Essex voted against the establishment of a Jewish society and a lecturer was dismissed for allegedly posting anti-Semitic material on Facebook.

== Vote to ratify Jewish Society ==
A proposal for the establishment of a Jewish society for students at the University of Essex was published on the university's Student Union website on 11 February 2019. More than 200 students voted against ratification of the society following advice from a university Amnesty society member that "The society has mentioned it will celebrate Israeli national day which has nothing to do with Judaism.[...] Until the society is politically neutral like every other religious society we will take a stance on this. So we urge you to please vote no until they are politically neutral." About 600 students voted on the ratification of the society, with approximately 64% voting in favour.

The university's Vice Chancellor, Professor Anthony Forster, later intervened stating that the society would be created irrespective of any ratification and the launch of a review to "ensure we provide unequivocal support to our Jewish students and staff." Amnesty International subsequently distanced itself from the university's Amnesty society members who had advised on the vote, stating that their remarks "do not reflect the view of the Essex University Amnesty Society and Amnesty International."

== Rally ==
The university held a rally in its main square on 28 February in solidarity with the Jewish community. The university's Vice Chancellor said, "Today, we have come together to show antisemitism is completely antithetical to the values of the University of Essex and it has absolutely no place on our campuses and in our relationships with each other."

== Dismissal of lecturer ==
Maaruf Ali, a computing lecturer at the university, was dismissed from his job in May 2019 following his suspension in February for concerns over Facebook posts from his account. Those posts included a claim that "Zionists" sought to establish a society at the university, as well as content that appeared to deny the Holocaust. Ali's dismissal came after an internal tribunal at the university.
