= Young European Research Universities Network =

Non-profit association

- Abbreviation: YERUN
- Formation: 2015
- Type: Education, Research, Innovation, Higher Education Institutions, Universities, Networks
- Headquarters: Rue du Trône 62, 1050 Brussels, Belgium
- Secretary General: Silvia Gomez Récio
- President: Prof. Dag Rune Olsen
- Website: yerun.eu

The Young European Research Universities Network (YERUN) founded in 2015 and based in Brussels, brings together excellence and value-driven young research universities. The network's objective is to strategically represent its members in the decision-making process at EU level, thus shaping their future and promoting their role in European societies. Further to its policy advocacy activity, the network also strengthens cooperation opportunities among its members in areas of mutual interest and raises their visibility via a dedicated communication strategy.

== History ==
YERUN was founded in 2015 by: University of Antwerp (Belgium); University of Southern Denmark (Denmark); University of Eastern Finland (Finland); Université Paris Dauphine (France); University of Bremen, University of Konstanz, Universität Ulm (Germany); Dublin City University (Ireland); Tor Vergata University of Rome (Italy); Maastricht University (Netherlands); Nova University Lisbon (Portugal); Universidad Autónoma de Barcelona, Universidad Autónoma de Madrid, Universidad Carlos III de Madrid, Universitat Pompeu Fabra (Spain); Linköping University (Sweden); Brunel University London and University of Essex (UK). The organisation was officially established as an international non-profit organisation in Belgium on 16 September 2019. Over the past years there have been changes in the membership of the network with some institutions leaving and new ones joining. YERUN welcomed new members in 2021: the university of Rijeka (Croatia); the University of Cyprus (Cyprus); UiT, the Arctic University of Norway (Norway) and the University of Limerick (Ireland), in 2022: the University of Klagenfurt (Austria), the University of Potsdam (Germany), the University of South-Eastern Norway (Norway) and the University of Stirling (United Kingdom); in 2023: Nicolaus Copernicus University in Toruń (Poland); and in 2024: Tallinn University. In 2024, the network counts 24 members from 17 European countries.

== Organisation ==
The network is led by the assembly of Rectors, Vice-Chancellors and Presidents of its member universities. The assembly elects an executive board of 5 members that includes a President, a vice-president, a Treasurer and two board members. The current president is Prof. Dag Rune Olsen (Rector of UiT – The Arctic University of Norway). The network's activities are coordinated by the Secretariat based in Brussels.

== YERUN member institutions ==
| Country | Institution(s) |
|---|---|
| Austria | University of Klagenfurt |
| Belgium | University of Antwerp |
| Croatia | University of Rijeka |
| Cyprus | University of Cyprus |
| Denmark | Syddansk Universitet |
| Finland | University of Eastern Finland |
| France | Paris Dauphine University |
| Germany | Ulm University; University of Bremen; University of Konstanz; University of Potsdam |
| Ireland | University of Limerick |
| Italy | University of Rome Tor Vergata |
| Netherlands | Maastricht University |
| Norway | University of South-Eastern Norway; University of Tromsø |
| Poland | Nicolaus Copernicus University in Toruń |
| Portugal | Universidade Nova de Lisboa |
| Spain | Autonomous University of Madrid; Charles III University of Madrid |
| Estonia | Tallinn University |
| United Kingdom | Brunel University London; University of Essex; University of Stirling |

== Executive board ==
| Name | Position | Institution | Country |
|---|---|---|---|
| Prof. Dag Rune Olsen | YEURN President | UiT – The Arctic University of Norway | Norway |
| Prof. João Amaro de Matos | YERUN Vice President | Universidade Nova de Lisboa | Portugal |
| Prof. Neville Wylie | YERUN Treasurer | University of Stirling | United Kingdom |
| Prof. Florian Schweigert | YERUN Board Member | University of Potsdam | Germany |
| Prof. Hildegard Schneider | YERUN Board Member | Maastricht University | Netherlands |

== YERUN Presidents ==
| Date | President | Institution | Country |
|---|---|---|---|
| 2015 - 2019 | Prof. Juan Romo | Universidad Carlos III de Madrid | Spain |
| 2019 - 2021 | Prof. Bernd Scholz-Reiter | University of Bremen | Germany |
| 2021 - 2023 | Prof. Snježana Prijić-Samaržija | University of Rijeka | Croatia |
| Current | Prof. Dag Rune Olsen | Rector of UiT – The Arctic University of Norway | Norway |
