= University of Essex =

Public university in Essex, England

Coordinates: 51.87633°N 0.94487°E

- Coat of arms
- Motto: Thought the harder, heart the keener
- Type: Public research university
- Established: 1964 – the first academic year 1965 – received university status by royal charter
- Academic affiliations: AMBA; Eastern ARC; Young European Research Universities Network; Universities UK
- Endowment: £9.1 million (2023)
- Budget: £317.8 million (2022/23)
- Chancellor: Sarah Perry
- Vice-Chancellor: Francis Bowen
- Administrative staff: 2,562 full-time equivalent (2019–20)
- Students: 17,000 (2022)
- Undergraduates: 12,348 (2019–20)
- Postgraduates: 2,577 (2019–20)
- Location: Essex, England
- Campus: Wivenhoe Park, Colchester; Southend-on-Sea(Closing by Aug 2026); Loughton Campus
Colours
- Nickname: The Essex Blades
- Mascot: Pebbles the Cat
- Website: essex.ac.uk

The University of Essex is a public research university in Essex, England. Established by royal charter in 1965, it is one of the original plate glass universities. The university comprises two campuses in the county, one in Loughton with its primary campus in Wivenhoe Park, Colchester.

Essex has a largely diverse student community and holds partnerships with more than 100 global higher education institutions. It was named University of the Year at the Times Higher Education Awards in 2018. Essex's Department of Government received Regius Professorship conferred by Queen Elizabeth II in 2013 and the university was awarded the Queen's Anniversary Prize on two occasions for advancing human rights in 2009 and social and economic research in 2017.

In the 2027 rankings of British universities, Essex is ranked 30th in the Complete University Guide, 23rd in The Guardian University Guide and 47th by The Sunday Times. It has produced alumni in several fields across the world; these include Nobel Prize laureates, a head of state, and senior governors and politicians.

== History ==
=== Foundation ===
The University of Essex is one of the seven original plate glass universities established between 1961 and 1965. The university shield consists of the ancient arms attributed to the Kingdom of Essex and the motto: "Thought the harder, heart the keener" is adapted from the Anglo-Saxon poem The Battle of Maldon.

In July 1959, Essex County Council accepted a proposal from Charles Leatherland, Baron Leatherland to establish a university in the county. A University Promotion Committee was formed, chaired by Lord Lieutenant of Essex, Sir John Ruggles-Brise, which submitted a formal application to the University Grants Committee requesting for the establishment of the University of Essex. Initial reports suggested that the Promotion Committee recommended Hylands Park in Chelmsford as the primary site, however, in May 1961 an announcement in the House of Commons preferred the foundation of the university within Wivenhoe and in December, Wivenhoe Park was acquired for the new university. In July 1962, R. A. Butler was appointed as chancellor, Albert Sloman as vice-chancellor, with Anthony Rowland-Joins as registrar.

The first Professors were appointed in May 1963: Alan Gibson in Physics, Ian Proudman in Mathematics, John Bradley in Chemistry, Richard Lipsey in Economics, Peter Townsend in Sociology, Donald Davie in Literature, and Jean Blondel in Government. Whilst undergoing clearing for construction work, an Appeal Fund was deployed upon a development plan and within six months it exceeded its £1million target with The Queen Mother and Sir Winston Churchill among contributors. In Autumn 1963, red was preferred as the university colour, the first prospectus was prepared and work began on the first permanent buildings. In January 1964, the university's academic robes were designed by Sir Hardy Amies, a Royal Warrant holder as designer to the Queen, and in March Sir John Ruggles-Brise was appointed the first Pro-Chancellor and Charles Leatherland, Baron Leatherland the first Treasurer of the university. Two months after, the university's Armorial Bearings were published with the motto "Thought the harder, heart the keener".

=== Expansion ===
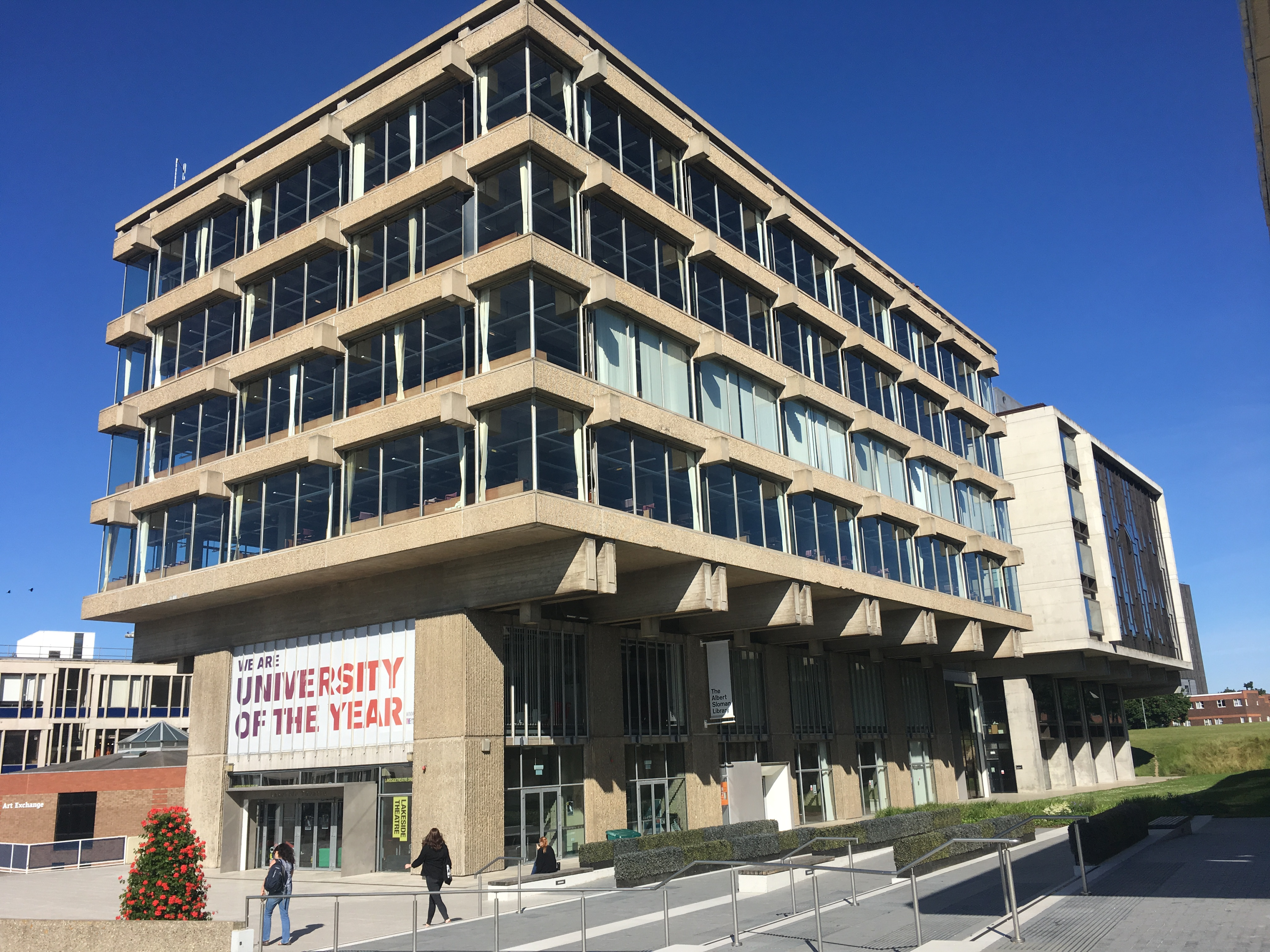
The Albert Sloman Library

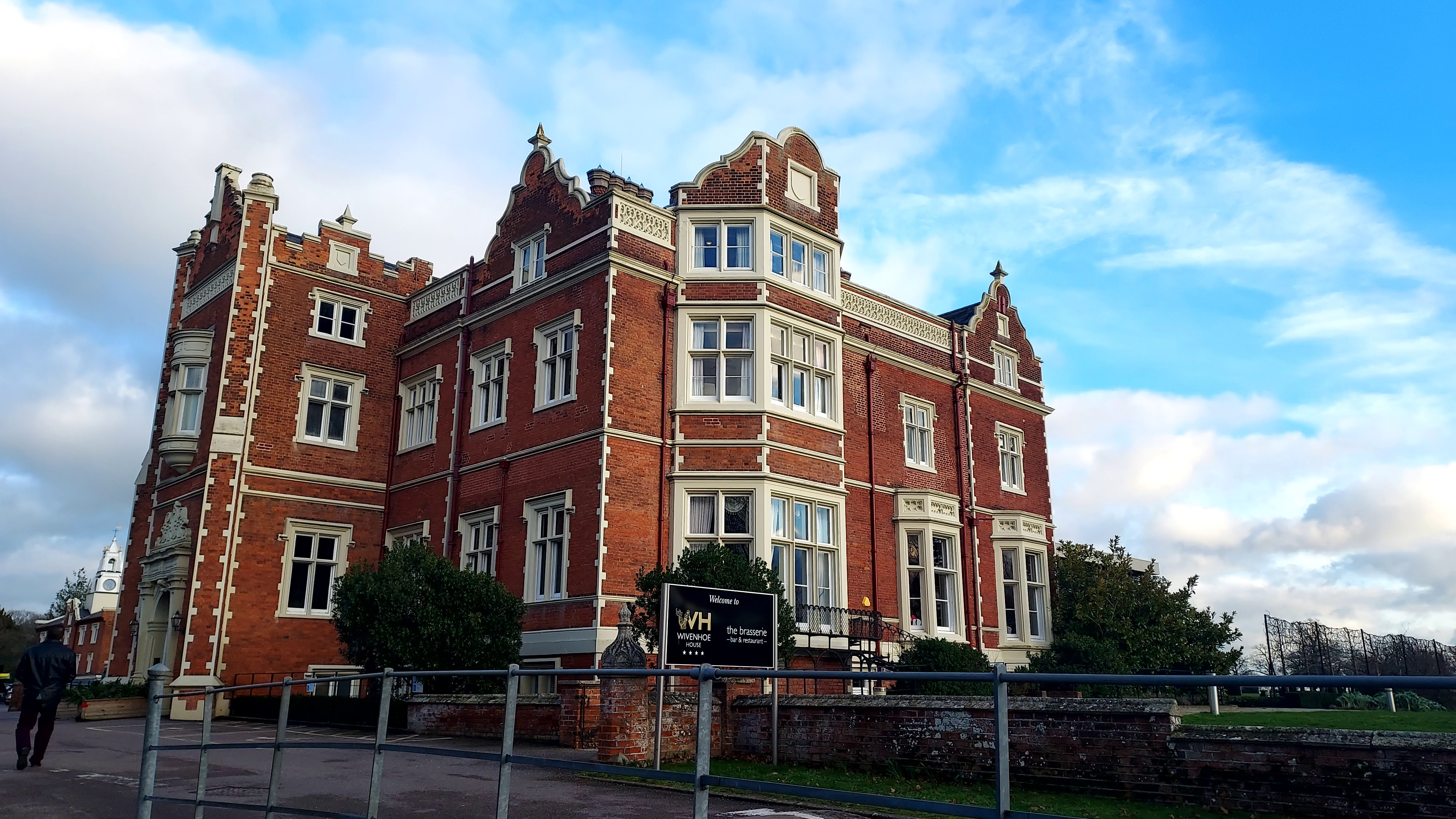
Wivenhoe House Hotel, University of Essex

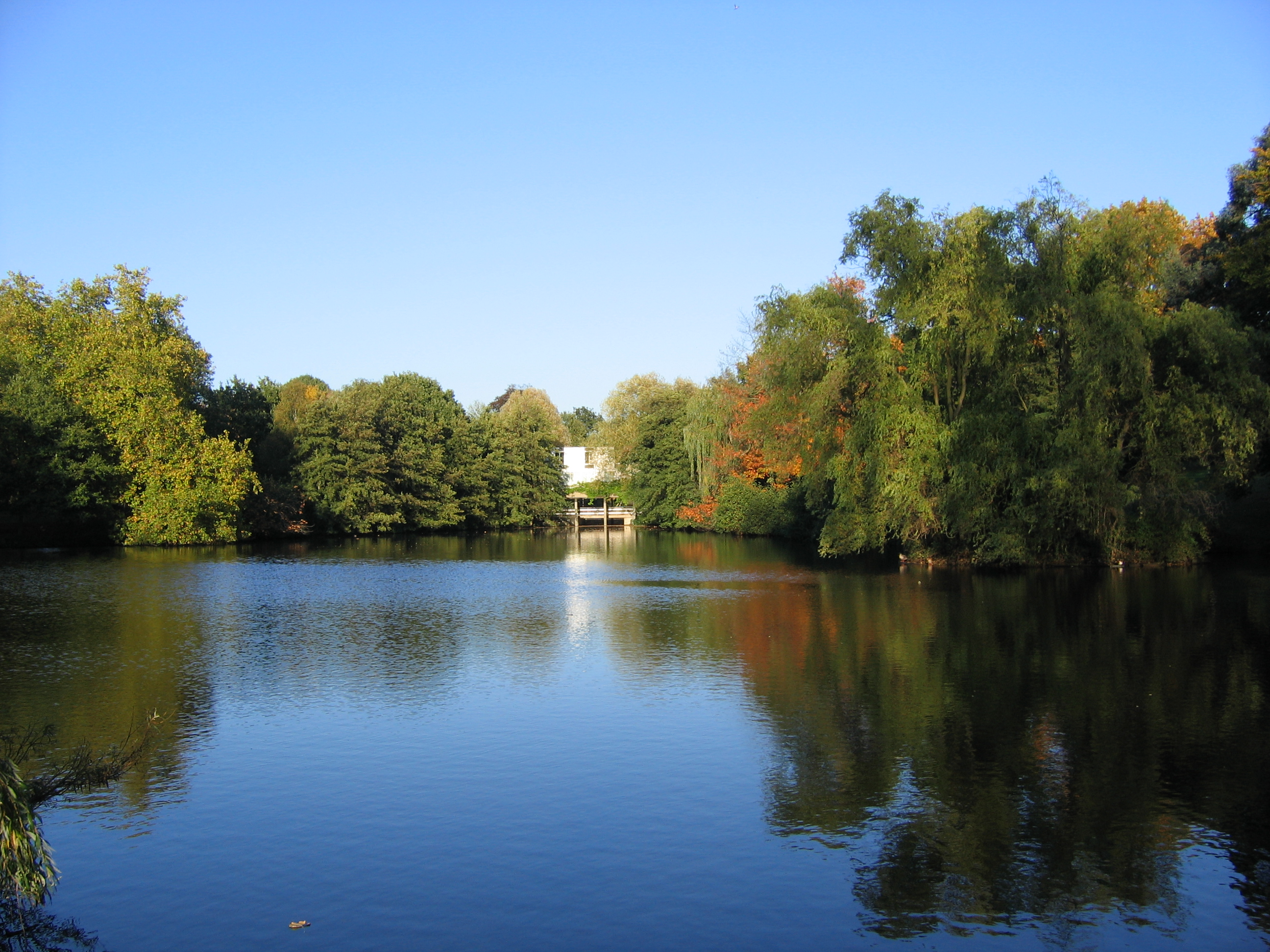
One of the lakes next to the Vice-Chancellor's House, University of Essex

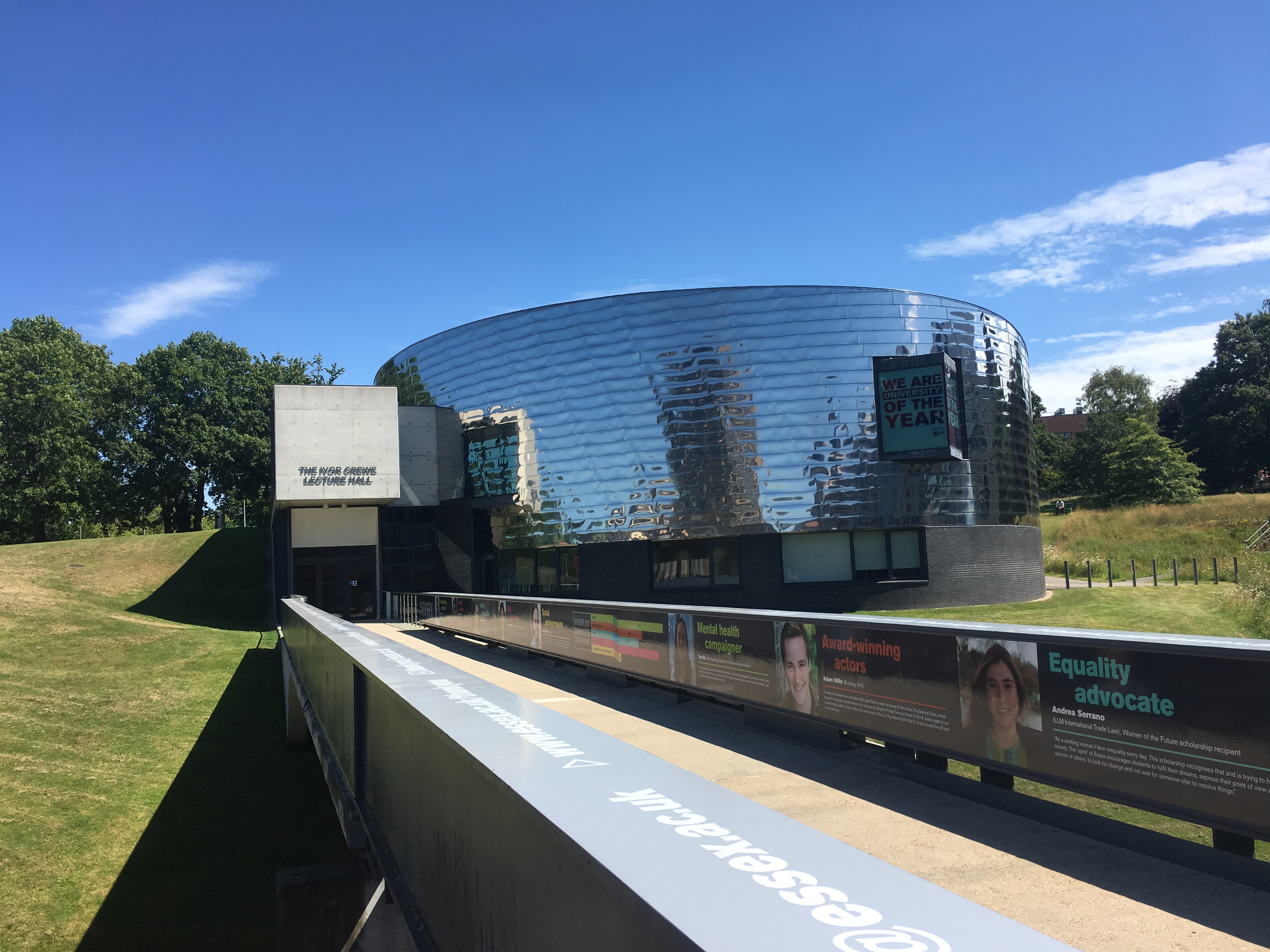
Ivor Crewe Lecture Hall

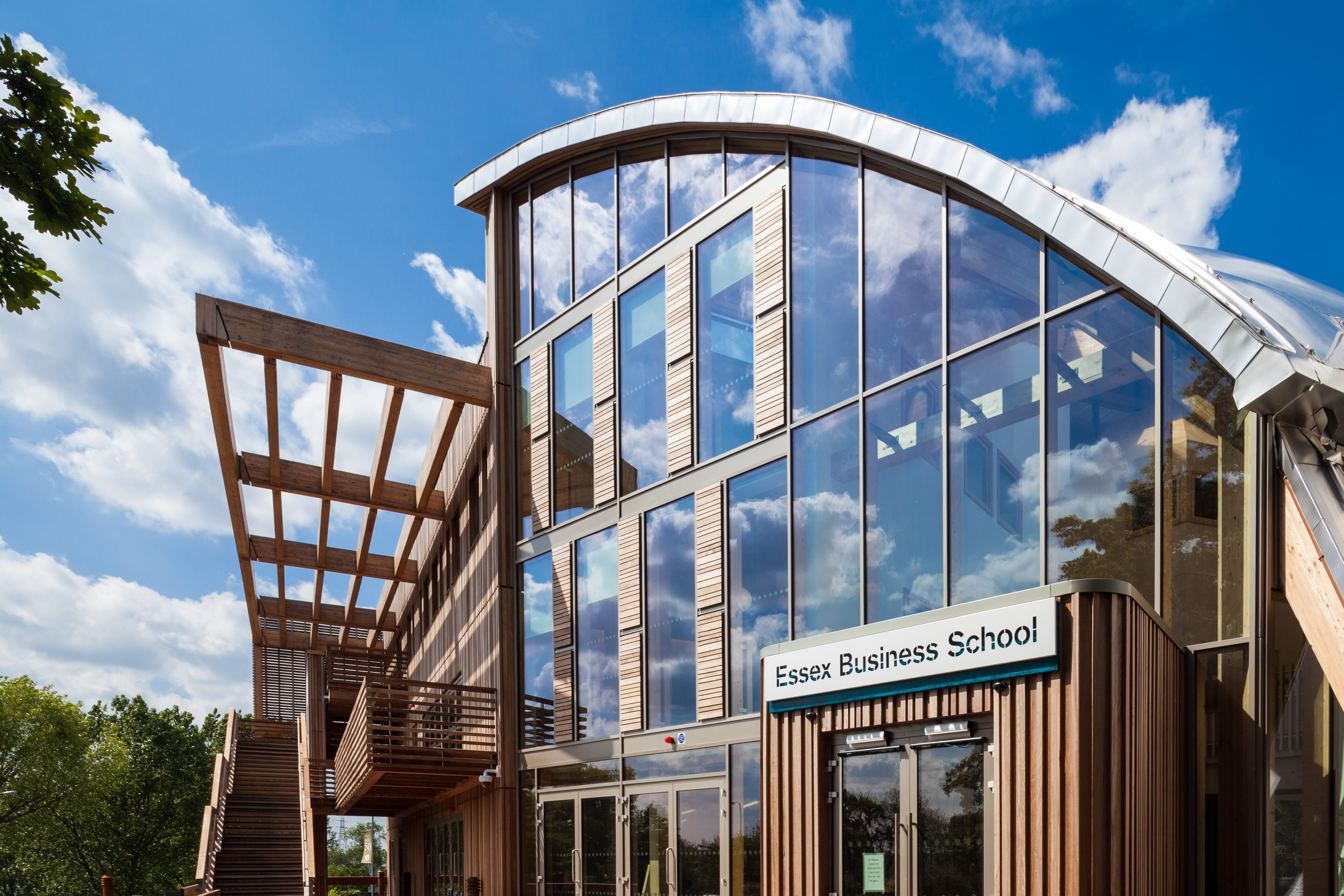
Essex Business School

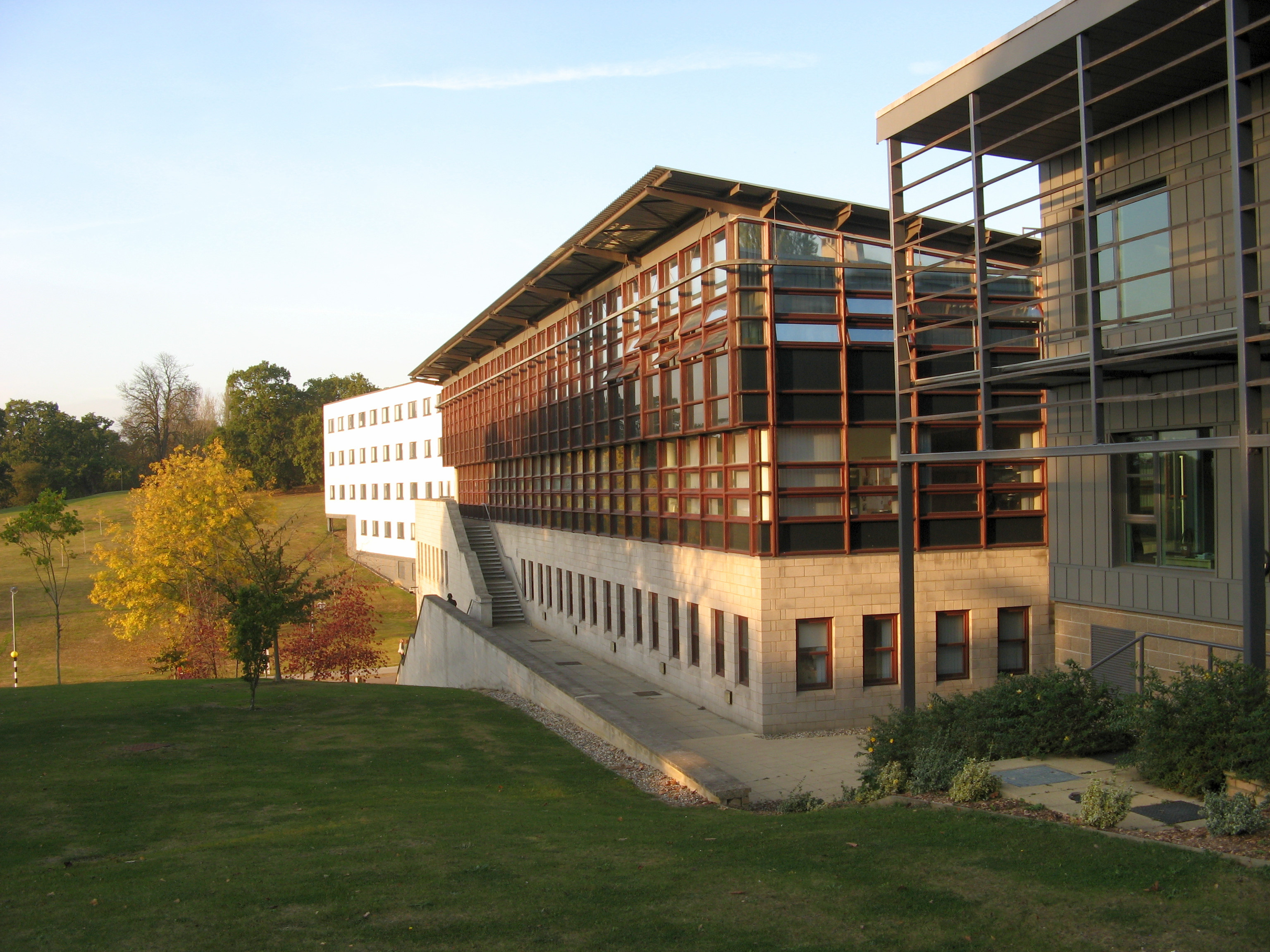
The Psychology building

In October 1964, the first 122 students arrived with 28 teaching staff in three schools: Comparative Studies, Physical Sciences and Social Studies. Departments of Chemistry, Physics, Government, Sociology, Literature, Mathematics and Economics opened along with the Language Centre (later the Department of Language and Linguistics) and the Computing Centre (later the Department of Computer Science and Electronic Engineering). Work started on the first residential tower, Rayleigh, with The Queen approving the grant of Charter to take effect from 11 January 1965 in December.

1965 drew 399 students for the start of the new academic year. The number of academic staff more than doubled to 61 and the first degrees, five MSc and five MA degrees, were awarded. Whilst construction began on the library building (later renamed the Albert Sloman Library), the Physics building opened and the first six floors of Rayleigh tower were ready for occupation. Dorothy E. Smith became the first female lecturer to be appointed, for the Department of Sociology. In December, University Court met for the first time with around 500 members. Six months later, work started on the Lecture Theatre Building and the 'Topping out' ceremony took place for Keynes tower.

In October 1966, the Hexagon Restaurant and General Store opened, with the number of students reaching 750. Lord Butler was installed as Chancellor at a ceremony held in Colchester's Moot Hall in 1967 and the first Honorary Degrees were presented, the university's mace was carried for the first time, while the first annual Degree Congregation saw 135 degrees conferred in July. At the start of the next academic year, the departments of Computer Science and Electronic Systems Engineering accepted their first students, the SSRC Data Bank (later renamed the UK Data Archive) was established and the Lecture Theatre Building and Library opened along with the first phase of the Social and Comparative Studies building, while work proceeded on Tawney and William Morris residential towers.

=== The protests of 1968 ===
Amid the worldwide escalation of social conflicts and protests against the Vietnam War, the University of Essex was at the vanguard of the 1960s student uproar. In March 1968, a demonstration against the visitation of the then Shadow Secretary State for Defence, Enoch Powell, received national publicity whereby seven students were summoned to disciplinary hearings to which was ultimately prevented by student sit-ins.

On Tuesday, 7 May 1968, Dr Thomas Inch from Porton Down paid a visit to host a lecture at the university. In a carefully planned demonstration, an indictment was read as Dr Inch began to speak citing chemical and biological warfare activities at Porton Down. Police intervention upon the call of the university was superseded by an insurmountable number of students who managed to prevent arrests.

On Friday, 10 May 1968, three students; Pete Archard, Raphael Halberstadt and David Triesman (now The Lord Triesman) were suspended and ordered off the campus. No evidence or charges were notified to the students, and no opportunity was given for the students to present their defence.

The university's magazine, Wyvern, reported that on Monday, 13 May, "Students picket all entrances to the university from early morning distributing leaflets calling all students and staff to meeting to discuss suspension of the three students. A huge meeting attended by nearly all the university population, voted overwhelmingly to refuse to participate in the university – in its place a Free University was declared ". After a week the three students were reinstated.

Many Essex students joined protests in Paris over the summer of 1968 and unrest on the Colchester campus continued into 1969.

=== The 1970s and 80s ===
Within the frame of the 1970s to the 1980s, the university expanded by installing a health care centre, day nursery, bookstore, exhibition gallery and constructed new student residences. The School of Law, Human Rights centre, Department of Philosophy and the Department of Biological Sciences were opened.

In the late 1970s to the early 80s, the university began concentrating its teaching into large departments. Cooperation with local companies were forged allowing the university to secure vital research contracts. Due to its growing international reputation, the university began to attract a sizable number of International students.

In 1987, Martin Harris was appointed Vice-Chancellor, succeeding the founding Vice-Chancellor, Albert Sloman. Within the same year, University of Essex alumnus Oscar Arias won the Nobel Peace Prize.

=== The 1990s ===
Entering the 1990s, the university extended further by building more residential space in the face of the increase in student population between 1991 and 1992. The Rab Butler Building was opened in 1991 as the headquarters for the British Household Panel Survey. On the 30th anniversary in 1993, the university had built itself up into 17 key departments, providing education and research opportunities for 5,500 students, and employing 1,300 staff and faculty. The university also contained 5 industrial units and housed the Economic and Social Research Council-funded UK Data Archive. Further expansion continued to take place after 1993, with the £5.5 million expansion scheme for the provision of 234 new apartments for 1,200 students in a new student village.

=== The 2000s ===
Between 2003 and 2004, the university continued to expand. University Quays, a student accommodation complex housing 770 students, opened in September 2003 and within the campus at the Network Centre building opened in May 2004 housing the Department of Electronic Systems Engineering and parts of the Department of Computer Science (which merged in 2007 to create the School of Computer Science and Electronic Engineering). In 2003 a new satellite campus was opened at Princess Caroline House in Southend-on-Sea.

The Ivor Crewe Lecture Hall, one of the largest lecture theatres in the country hosting a 1,000-seat capacity, opened in 2006. The building was designed by multi-award-winning architect Patel Taylor and attracted a mixed response; Prince Charles referred to it as 'like a dustbin' whilst the Civic Trust, a charity of which he is patron, awarded it a Civic Trust award (2008) for making 'an outstanding contribution to the quality and appearance of the environment'. The building was named after Sir Ivor Crewe in April 2007 to mark his retirement from the position of vice chancellor, a position he chaired since 1995.

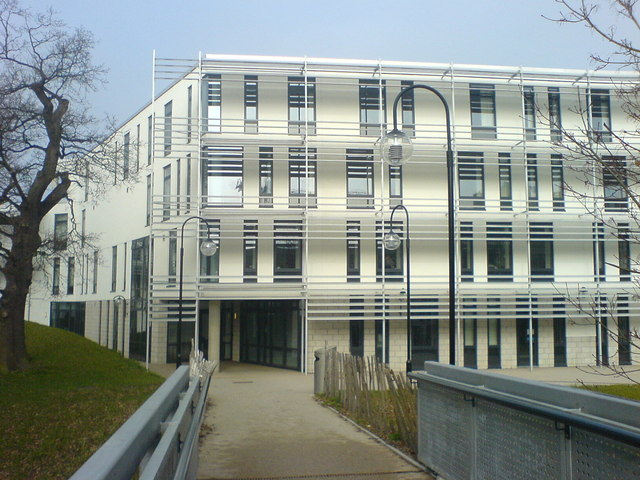
Social Science Research Centre – home to UK Data Archive and Institute for Social and Economic Research

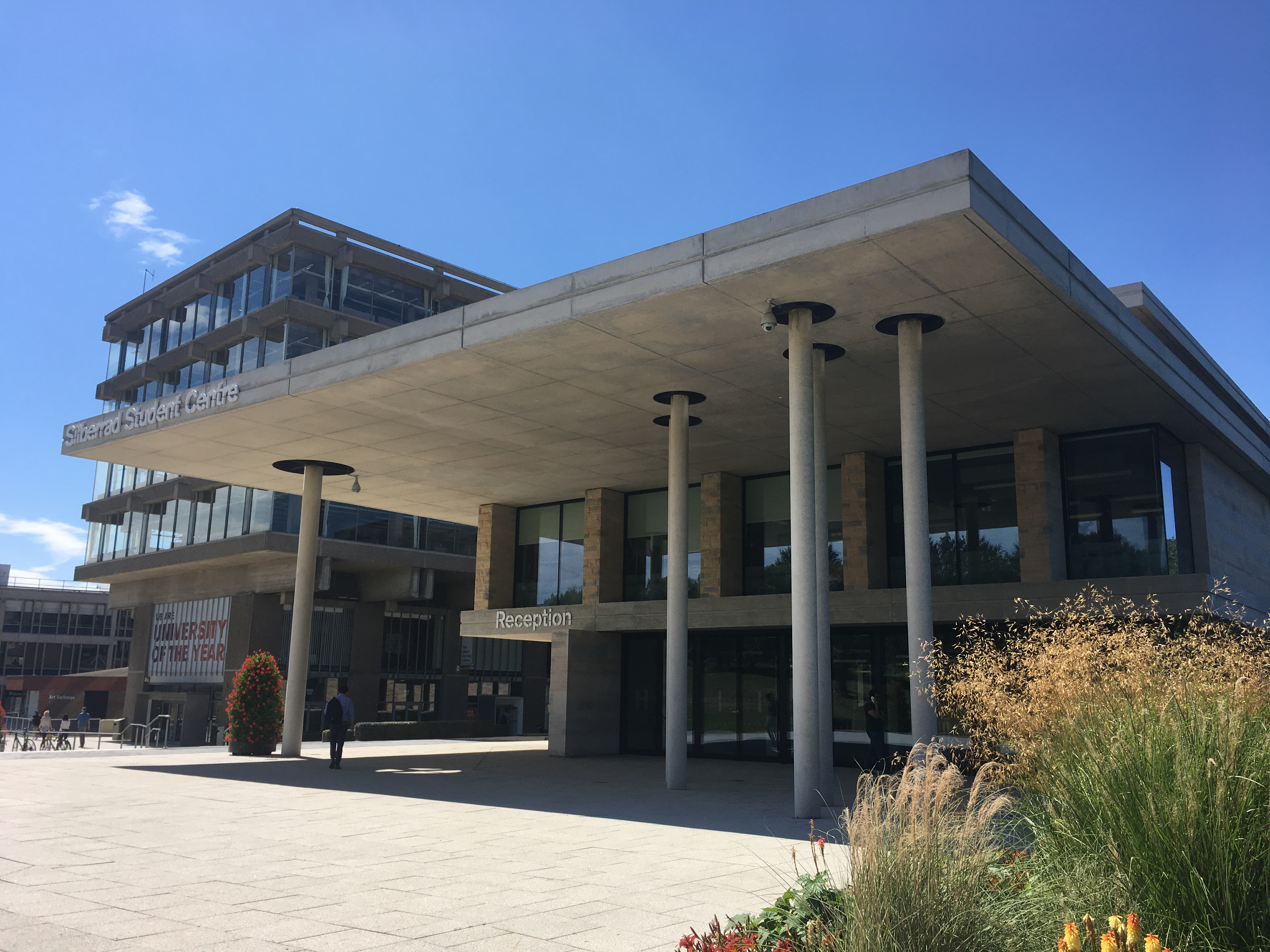
Silberrad Centre, Colchester Campus

The Gateway Building at the Southend Campus opened in January 2007 providing facilities for Essex Business School, East 15 Acting School and the School of Health and Social Care plus a business incubation centre. The university also converted a former church into the Clifftown Studios to provide East 15 students with a theatre, studios and workshop spaces, and thus, the university has a theatre at each of its three campuses.

The Social Science Research Centre was completed in February 2007 housing the Institute for Social and Economic Research and the UK Data Archive. Through a unique collaboration with the University of East Anglia, Essex founded the University of Suffolk in 2007. A new building for the health and human sciences opened in 2008, now named the Kimmy Eldridge Building in honour of Kimmy Eldridge who joined the university in 1994 to establish the Nursing and Health Studies Unit, now part of the School of Health and Social Care. The Centre for Brain Science opened in 2009 providing a new home for the Department of Psychology.

=== 2010 to present ===
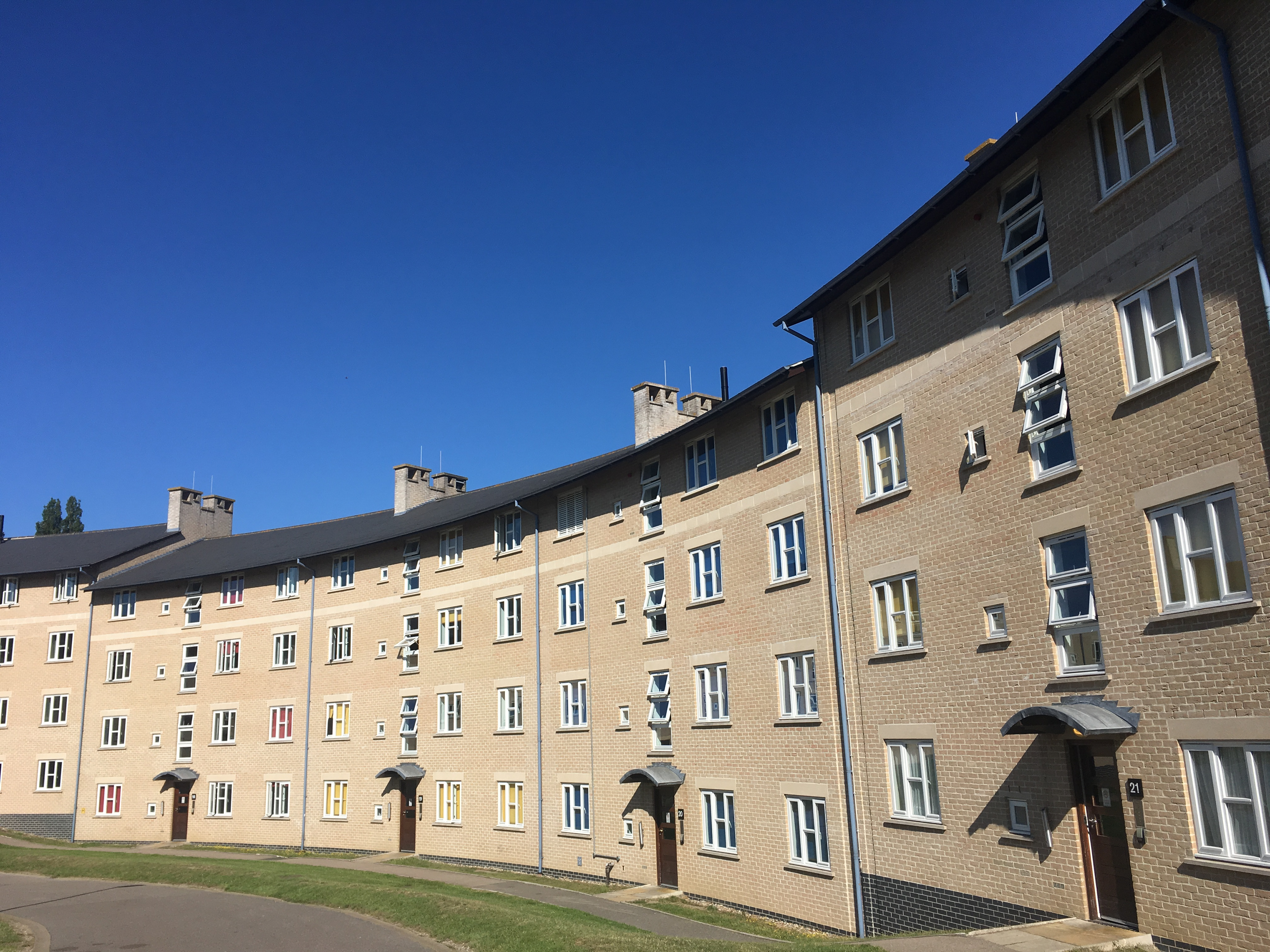
South Courts

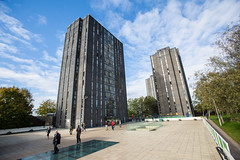
The North Towers at Colchester Campus built in the 1960s

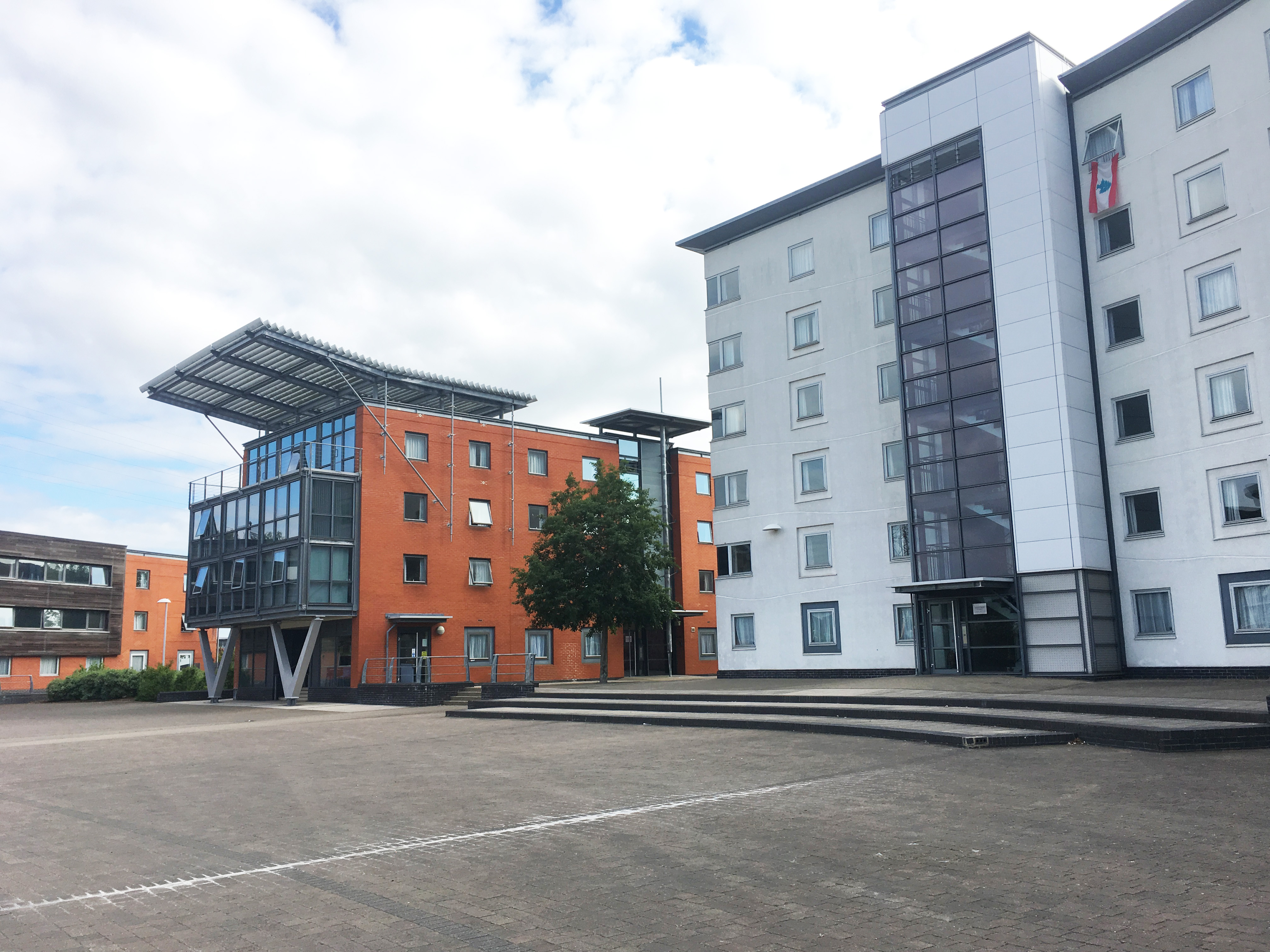
The Quays student accommodation

Essex Business School opened in 2015, the UK's first zero-carbon business school building, intended as a symbolic gesture to sustainable and ethical business practices. It houses a winter garden giving the building its own micro-climate and a rainwater pond recycling water to cool the building. The building includes an operating trading floor with Bloomberg terminals offering direct use of Bloomberg market data and information. The building won the RICS Design through Innovation Award for the East of England.

Extensions to the Silberrad Student Centre and Albert Sloman Library were made in 2015 which received RIBA's Regional Building of the Year Award 2016 plus a national RIBA award.

The Forum Southend-on-Sea opened in 2013 and was a joint project between Essex, Southend-on-Sea Borough Council and South Essex College and became a runner-up in the 'Buildings that Inspire' category of The Guardian University Awards in 2015. The Southend campus closed at the end of August 2025, with its courses and students relocating to the Colchester campus.

In 2013, Queen Elizabeth II conferred upon the university the Regius Professorship, recognising "50 years of excellence in research and education in political science at Essex". The first Regius professor was David Sanders of the Government Department, who held the post from 2014–2017. Since December 2017, Kristian Skrede Gleditsch was appointed as the second Regius Professor.

In 2018, a STEM Centre opened to conglomerate the university's science departments and The Copse student accommodation opened offering 643 new single ensuite rooms and studios. In 2019, the Innovation Centre, Knowledge Gateway opened offering space for more than 50 start-up technology businesses.

In March 2019, Essex joined seven other universities across European to form the Young Universities for the Future of Europe (YUFE) Alliance. Later in June 2019, the European Commission announced YUFE to be one of 17 projects that will receive funding for a three-year pilot under the European Universities Initiative funded by the Erasmus+ programme. The objective of the programme is to create 'European Universities' based on cross-border alliances of higher education institutions that share a common long-term strategy in the promotion of European values and identity.

In December 2025, Essex announced that it would be closing its Southend campus at the end of the 2025/26 academic year and cutting around 400 jobs (half academic, half in professional services), with around 800 students relocating to the Colchester campus, as a result of a fall in international recruitement.

== Colchester campus and architecture ==
Wivenhoe Park, the home of the primary campus, was painted by landscape painter John Constable in 1816. The park houses the main 1960s buildings along with Wivenhoe House, an 18th-century mansion that also features in Constable's painting. Wivenhoe House hotel was closed in December 2010 for major refurbishment and reopened in 2012 as a combined four-star country house hotel and hotel school. The Edge Hotel School was originally a partnership between the university and the Edge Foundation and is now a department of the university. It is the UK's first working hotel school dedicated to the development of future leaders of the hotel, events and hospitality industry.

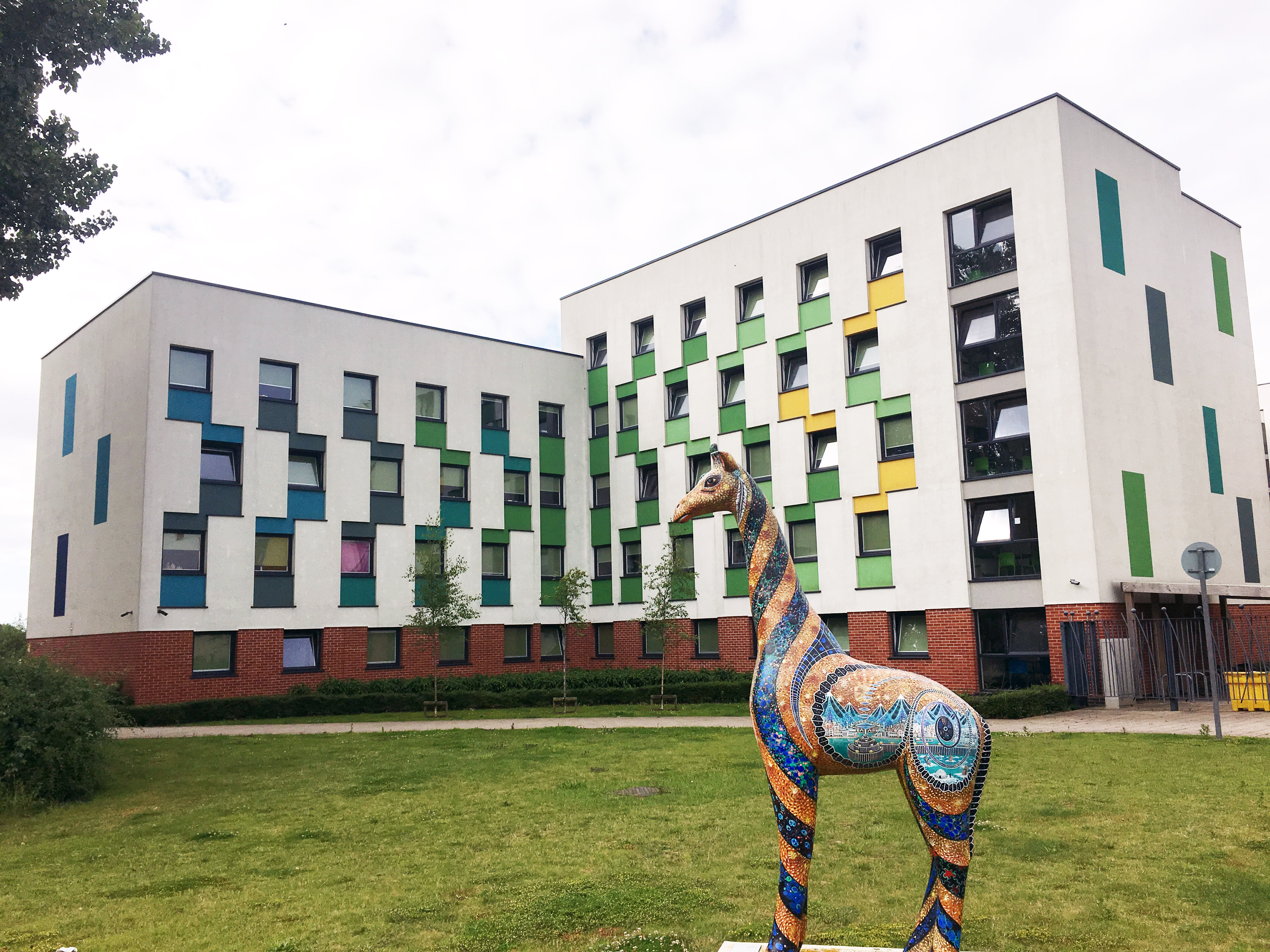
The Meadows student accommodation

With its concrete architecture, the university is typical of England's 1960s universities and was heavily influenced by the international Brutalist architecture movement. Due to its particular form of architecture involving the use of prefabricated concrete and glass, the university is also referred to as a plateglass university.

The architect of the campus, Kenneth Capon of the Architects' Co-Partnership, took the Tuscan town of San Gimignano with its squares and towers as an inspiration (the university has six residential towers mainly for undergraduates, but the original plan was to build 29).

The landmark buildings include the residential towers, The Hexagon and the Albert Sloman library – which was selected as an 'icon of British design' by the Victoria and Albert Museum in its 2012 exhibition British Design 1948–2012. The library has one of the few still operating continuous-loop paternoster lifts in the country.

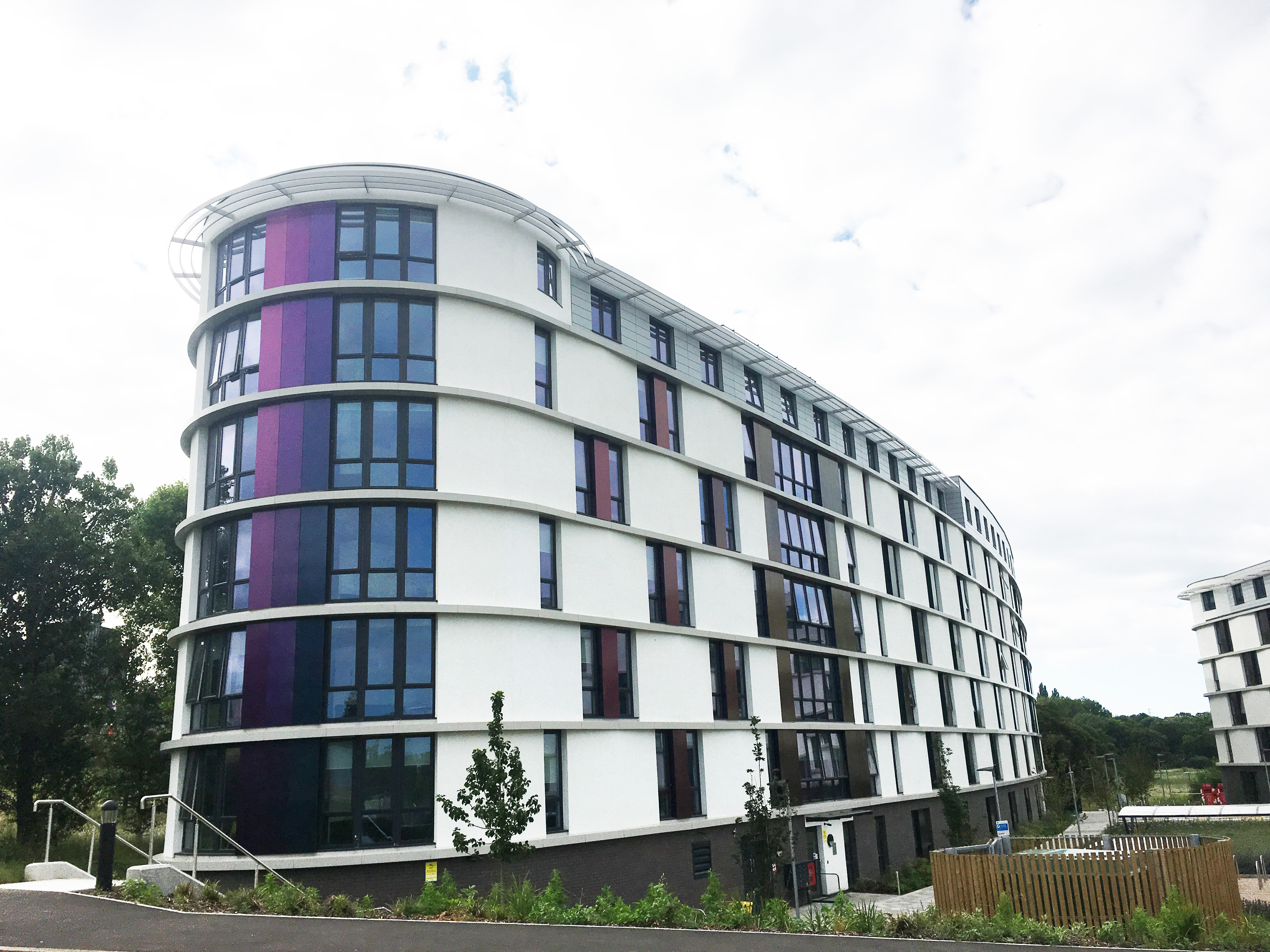
The Copse student accommodation

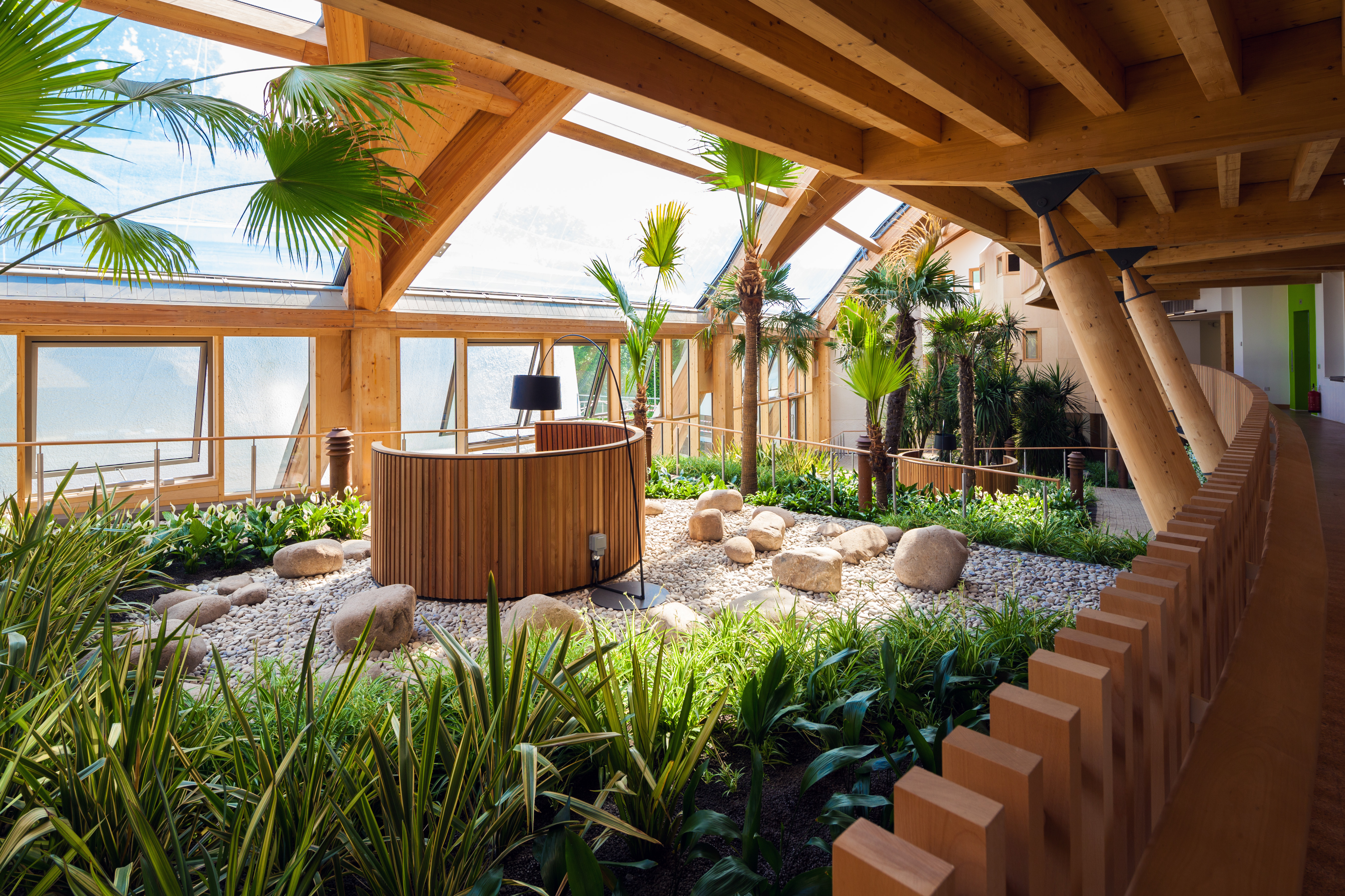
Inside the Essex Business School, the first carbon-zero business school in the UK

An exhibition called "Something Fierce" was created in The Hexagon to celebrate the university's 50th anniversary in 2014, reflecting on the university's founding vision and its relationship with its architecture. The exhibition was curated by art historian Jules Lubbock and director of the university's Art Exchange gallery. The university's original buildings were also featured in the Futures Found exhibition at the Royal Academy of Arts in 2017 which reflected on post-war architecture in the UK.

The Silberrad Student Centre and extension of the Albert Sloman Library completed in 2015 were designed to reflect the Brutalist architecture of the original campus buildings. The project was named RIBA Regional Building of the Year Award in 2016.

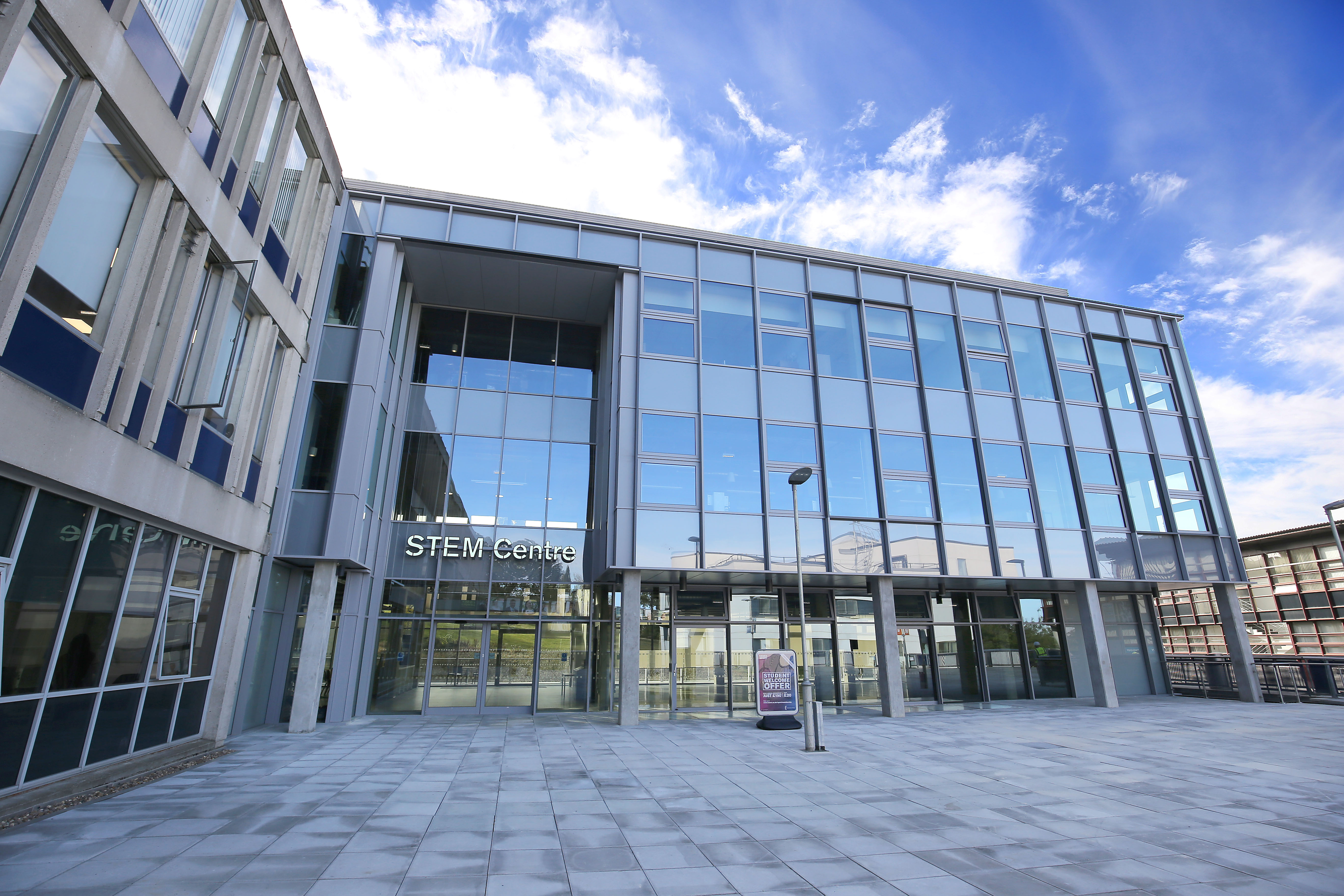
The STEM Centre

Essex Business School also opened in 2015 and won the Design through Innovation category at the RICS Awards 2016 for the East of England.

== Organisation ==
The university is organised into three faculties, comprising 21 schools and departments, spanning the Humanities, Social Sciences and Science and Health.

=== Departments ===
- Department of Economics
- Department of Government
- Department of History
- Department of Language and Linguistics
- Department of Literature, Film, and Theatre Studies
- Department of Psychology
- Department of Psychosocial and Psychoanalytic Studies
- Department of Sociology and Criminology
- Edge Hotel School
- Essex Business School
- Essex Pathways
- Institute for Social and Economic Research
- School of Biological Sciences
- School of Computer Science and Electronic Engineering
- School of Health and Social Care
- School of Law
- School of Mathematics, Statistics and Actuarial Science
- School of Philosophy and Art History
- School of Sport, Rehabilitation and Exercise Science
- East 15 Acting School
- UK Data Archive

=== Flagship institutes ===
Essex has three flagship institutes which bring together academics from across disciplines and departments to deliver research in a specialist area. These are the Human Rights Centre, the Institute for Analytics and Data Science and the Institute for Social and Economic Research.

==== Human Rights Centre ====
The Human Rights Centre at Essex was established in 1982. One of the first academic centres of its kind in the world, the work of the Human Rights Centre led to the university receiving a Queen's Anniversary Prize in 2010 for its work to promote human rights internationally.

==== Institute for Analytics and Data Science ====
The Institute for Analytics and Data Science (IADS) works with businesses and local, regional and national authorities on management and transfer of big data; methodological and analytical methods for different types of applications from financial and business to biomedical; and socio-economic aspects of data; and ethical, legal and human rights aspects of data.

==== Institute for Social and Economic Research ====
The Institute for Social and Economic Research (ISER) is a research centre for the analysis of panel data in Economics and Sociology. It opened in 1989 as the ESRC Research Centre on Micro-Social Change in Britain and now houses the ESRC-funded Understanding Society project, a longitudinal study of the socio-economic circumstances and attitudes of 100,000 individuals in 40,000 British households. ISER's work led to Essex receiving the Queen's Anniversary Prize for Higher and Further Education in 2017.

==== Institute of Public Health and Wellbeing ====
The Institute of Public Health and Wellbeing (IPHW) is a multidisciplinary international research centre partnering with national (NHS Trust, Public Health England, British Heart Foundation) and international (WHO, WHF) organisations for tackling public health issues and improving health and wellbeing by means of innovations.

=== Notable departments ===
==== Essex Law School ====
The Essex School of Law is ranked 19th in the UK, 72nd in the world and 3rd in the UK by research power through THE World University Rankings (2022).

==== Department of Economics ====
The Essex Department of Economics is one of the founding departments of the university. It consistently ranks among the top economics departments in the UK for research: 4th in REF 2021 on research power and 3rd in REF 2008 on GPA. Two later economics Nobel prize winners have either studied or taught at the department: Christopher Pissarides (laureate 2010) obtained undergraduate and postgraduate degrees in economics, whereas Oliver Hart (laureate 2016) was a lecturer at the economics department.

In 1971, while Professor of Economics at the University of Essex, Tony Atkinson founded the Journal of Public Economics, today regarded as the top field journal in public economics, and proceeded to be coeditor of the journal for over a quarter of a century. The Atkinson-Stiglitz theorem, a landmark result in public economics, was published in 1976 in the journal. At the beginning of his career, influential econometrician Peter Phillips who later founded the journal Econometric Theory, was a lecturer in Essex.

The Essex Department of Economics placed 1st on value-added three years running in the 2024-2026 Guardian University Guides.

==== Essex Business School ====
Essex Business School (EBS) is deemed the first carbon-zero business school in the UK, and is granted funding by the Economic and Social Research Council. The Essex MBA is accredited by the Association of MBAs, and in 2024, Essex Business School became one of the top business schools globally when it was awarded AACSB (Association to Advance Collegiate Schools of Business) accreditation.

==== Department of Government ====
The Essex Department of Government has been consistently ranked as top for research in every UK Government's assessments of research excellence. In the Research Excellence Framework in 2014, Essex recorded the average GPA score of 3.54 with 68 percent of its outputs graded as 4*. An article published by the Political Studies Association noted: "This is a tremendous achievement and further cements Essex's reputation as the leading political science department in the country."

The department has four major Research Centres: The Jean Monnet European Centre of Excellence, the Michael Nicholson Centre for Conflict and Cooperation, the Centre for Ideology and Discourse Analysis (CIDA) and the Centre on the Politics of Representation in Crisis (CPRC). The Essex Summer School is organised in Social Science Data Analysis since 1967.

The department is home to the British Journal of Political Science.

The Essex School of Discourse Analysis emerged from the graduate programme in ideology and discourse analysis developed by Ernesto Laclau at Essex and informed by his work with Chantal Mouffe.

Notable academics linked to the department over its history include Brian Barry, Sarah Birch, R. A. W. Rhodes, Jean Blondel, Sir Ivor Crewe, Peter Frank, Robert E Goodin, Anthony King, Ernesto Laclau and Kristian Skrede Gleditsch, current holder of the Regius Professorship in Political Science.

The department has five research centres: the Centre for Criminology, the Centre for Latin American and Caribbean Studies, the Centre for Intimate and Sexual Citizenship, the Centre for Research in Economics Sociology and Innovation, and the Centre for Migration Studies.

Other notable academics linked to the department over its history include Joan Busfield, Stan Cohen, BBC presenter and former chair of the Social History Society Pamela Cox, Leonore Davidoff, Diane Elson, Miriam Glucksmann, David Lockwood and Mary McIntosh.

==== Department of Sociology and Criminology ====
The Department of Sociology and Criminology was one of the founding departments of the university. Its founding professor was Peter Townsend with Geoffrey Hawthorn, Herminio Martins and Paul Thompson its first academic appointments in 1964. Dorothy E. Smith was the first female lecturer and was appointed in 1966.

==== East 15 Acting School ====
In September 2000, the East 15 Acting School was acquired by the university. The school is based in Loughton in southwest Essex. East 15 topped The Times and Sunday Times Good University Guide's rankings for drama in September 2018 and was ranked first in The Guardian University Guide 2020. In 2017 research by The Stage showed East 15 was the UK's most diverse drama school with a third of students from BAME backgrounds.

==== Edge Hotel School ====
Edge Hotel School is the first hotel school in the UK with a fully commercial four star country house hotel on campus for students to gain practical skills whilst undertaking academic study. The School started events management courses in 2019 and has partnered with the o2 Arena for live projects, and the BRIT Awards for student work experience. The School achieved 1st in the UK For student satisfaction in the 2020 National Student Survey (NSS). The School was awarded in 2025 double Platinum Sustainable Essex award for its Uniform Reform and Food Waste sustainable initiative projects.

==== School of Computer Science and Electronic Engineering ====
The School of Computer Science and Electronic Engineering was inaugurated on 1 August 2007. It was created by merging two long-established departments: The Department of Computer Science and the Department of Electronic Systems Engineering which both began in 1966.

According to a report to UK Parliament, the UK's AI research started in the 1950s and 1960s when the four major AI research centres at universities of Edinburgh, Sussex, Essex, and Cambridge were formed.

Notable academics linked to the school include Tony Brooker, Richard Bartle, Mohammed Ghanbari, Riccardo Poli, Edward Tsang, Ray Turner, and Hani Hagras.

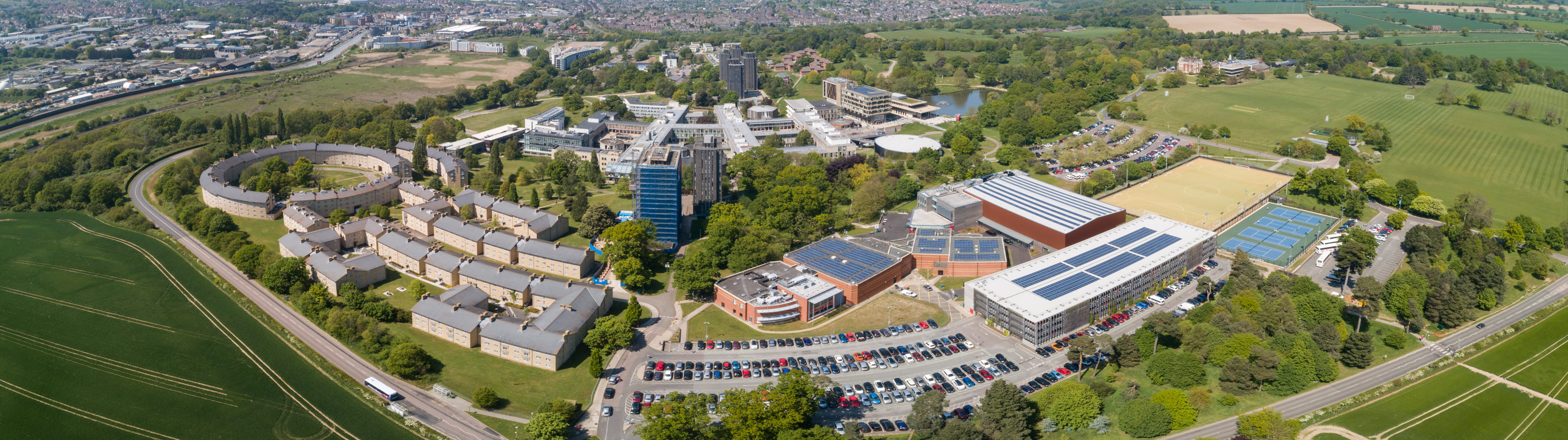
Aerial view of Colchester Campus

==== UK Data Archive ====
The UK Data Archive is a national centre of expertise in data archiving in the United Kingdom (UK). It houses the largest collection of digital data in the social sciences and humanities in the UK. The UK Data Archive was originally founded in 1967 on the Colchester Campus as the Social Science Research Council (SSRC) Data Bank.

== Partnerships ==
The university has stated its priority to enhance new and existing partnerships and initiatives at international and domestic level. A recent development includes the establishment of the first "European university" through the Young Universities for the Future of Europe (YUFE), an alliance of eight leading young European universities and six associate partners of higher education, non-governmental and private sector, selected by the European Commission. Essex is a member of the Young European Research Universities Network (YERUN) which promotes timely and relevant research collaboration across significant areas with special attention towards future educational strategies and policies. Additionally, the YERUN promotes student and staff mobility over 18 universities and 12 EU countries.

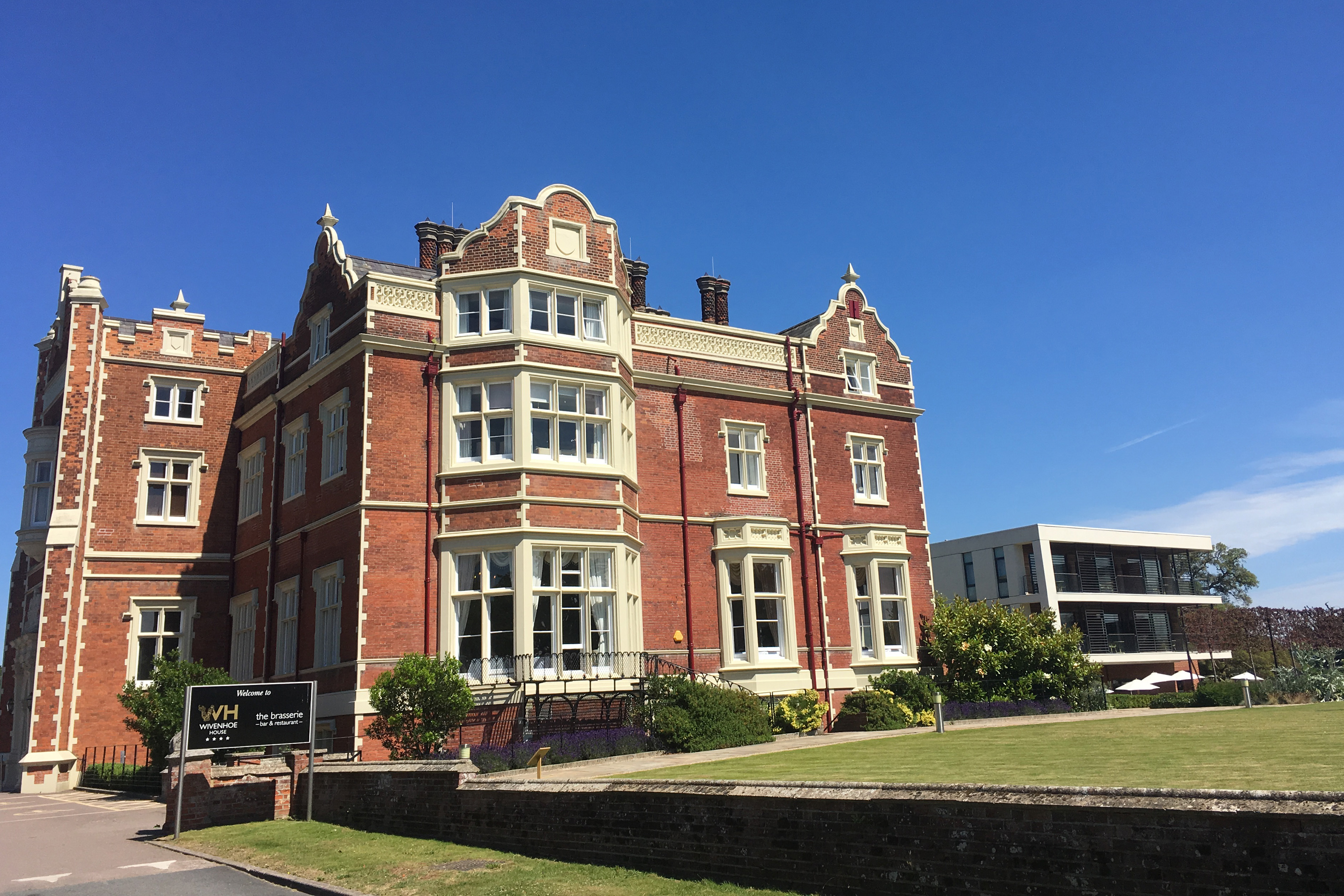
Wivenhoe House hotel

The university has a growing number of international academic partnerships offering a range of dual degrees, double degrees, honours, masters and doctoral programmes with universities in China, France, Germany, Japan, Russia and Singapore. Essex also has link, friendship and progression arrangements with more than 100 higher education institutions around the world.

Essex's School of Computer Science and Electronic Engineering and Northwest University in China launched a double degree programme in 2017 that was approved by the Chinese Ministry of Education. As a prestigious joint four-year programme, students will complete the first three years in China, with Essex staff travelling to Xi'an to deliver month-long modules followed by online support from the UK, to completing the final year in the UK. After completing the final year in the UK, students are awarded qualifications from both institutions; a BSc in electronic systems engineering from Essex and a BSc in electronic information science and technology.

Essex also has growing links with a range of Chinese universities including Shanghai University of Finance and Economics, Sichuan International Studies University in Chongqing and Guangdong University of Foreign Studies.

Since 2014, Essex has offered a range of degree courses in partnership with Kaplan Singapore. The partnership between Kaplan and Essex now extends to various full-time and part-time programmes in partnership with Essex Business School, Edge Hotel School and soon, the Department of Psychology and the School of Sports, Rehabilitation and Exercise Sciences.

Other partnerships include an international dual-degree programme offered in collaboration between the Faculty of Political Science at Chulalongkorn University in Thailand and the Department of Government at Essex; a dual-degree partnership with National Dong Hwa University College of Humanities and Social Sciences in Taiwan; validation arrangements with Nanyang Academy of Fine Arts in Singapore; a Masters course in Entrepreneurship and Innovation led by Essex and HKU Space in Hong Kong; and pathways to courses in Essex Business School and Essex Law School from Brickfields Asia College in Malaysia.

Essex is now the primary academic partner of the Tavistock and Portman NHS Foundation Trust in London accrediting a growing range of postgraduate courses including its MA in The Foundations of Psychodynamic Psychotherapy, the Doctorate in Child, Community & Educational Psychology and the Doctorate in Child & Educational Psychology.

Essex's collaboration with Kaplan Open Learning delivers degrees through the University of Essex Online and was named public/private partnership of the year at the PIEoneer Awards in 2017.

University of Essex International College is a partnership between Kaplan International Pathways and the university offering degree preparation courses for international students at the Colchester Campus.

The University of Essex has established the Eastern Arc research consortium with the University of East Anglia and the University of Kent to lead on research collaborations aligned with the United Nations' Sustainable Development Goals.

== Reputation ==
The University of Essex was named University of the Year at the Times Higher Education Awards in 2018. It won the International Collaboration of the Year Award at the Times Higher Education Awards 2019 for its work with Amnesty International and five other universities on the Digital Verification Corps, which investigates human rights violations around the world.

On two occasions Essex has been awarded the Queen's Anniversary Prize for Higher and Further Education, in 2009 for its "advancing the legal and broader practice of international human rights," and in 2017 for its "authoritative social and economic research to inform the policies of governments for the improvement of people's lives."

For many years Essex was among the smallest multi-faculty universities in Britain but its strategic plan 2013–19 set a target of expanding by around 50% to around 15,000 students.

It was a member of the 1994 Group. It is now a member of the Young European Research Universities Network (YERUN) and Young Universities for the Future of Europe (YUFE) alliance.

Essex has developed an international reputation for teaching and research. The annual Summer School in Social Science Data Analysis and Collection, celebrated its 50th year in 2017, more than 15,000 faculty and students from all over the world have completed courses through the Summer School over the past five decades.

The University of Essex was rated in the top 20 in the UK in the Research Excellence Framework (REF 2014) and has been in the top 15 for overall student satisfaction six years running, amongst mainstream English universities, according to the National Student Survey (NSS, 2018).

Essex's alumni include two Nobel laureates, making the university one of only three non-Russell Group universities which have a Nobel laureate alumnus, alongside the University of Greenwich and the London School of Hygiene & Tropical Medicine. The 1987 Nobel Peace Prize was awarded to Óscar Arias, who completed his doctorate in political science in 1973. The 2010 Nobel Prize for Economics was awarded to Christopher Pissarides who gained his BA and MA degrees in economics in the early 1970s. In 2016 former Essex academic Oliver Hart won the Nobel Prize for Economics. Derek Walcott, who received the 1992 Nobel Prize in Literature, served as Professor of Poetry at the university from 2010 to 2013 before his retirement.

=== Rankings ===
Rankings
National rankings
- Complete (2027): 30
- Guardian (2027): 23
- Times / Sunday Times (2027): 47

Global rankings
- ARWU (2026): 501–600
- QS (2027): 438=
- THE (2026): 301–350

Essex was rated Gold in the Teaching Excellence Framework (TEF) in 2017. The TEF Panel noted students from all backgrounds achieved outstanding outcomes with regards to continuation and progression to highly skilled employment or further study and outstanding levels of satisfaction with teaching, academic support, and assessment and feedback. In the 2023 TEF assessment, Essex's award was revised to "Silver".

Essex has been consistently ranked first for politics research and was once again ranked top in the Research Excellence Framework 2014 (REF2014) for politics and international studies. Essex was 19th overall, out of mainstream UK universities, according to the Times Higher Education's 'intensity' ranking for REF2014 which mapped university performance against the proportion of eligible staff submitted. Nine Essex subjects were ranked in the top 25 in the UK using this 'intensity' measure including sociology, economics, business and management, art history, philosophy, law, history and sport and exercise sciences.

Nationally, Essex is rated 39th top UK university in 2023, was ranked 29th overall in The Times and The Sunday Times Good University Guide 2019 and was shortlisted for its University of the Year Award in 2018. The university was ranked 251st–300th in the Times Higher Education World University Rankings 2020 and in the top 20 for international outlook within this ranking. The university was 370th in the QS World University Rankings 2020. According to the Times Higher Education 100 Under 50 rankings published in 2014, the university was placed 22nd, up seven places from the previous year.

Essex is ranked in the top 50 for social sciences and 51st for law in the Times Higher Education World University Rankings by subject 2019. Essex is also ranked 126th–150th for Business and Economics, 201st–250th for Arts and Humanities, and 175th–200th for Computer Science in the Times Higher Education World University Rankings. In the QS World University Rankings 2019 by subject, Essex is ranked 33rd for politics and international relations, 47th for sociology, 101st–150th for economics and econometrics, 101st–150th for linguistics, 151st–200th for English language and literature and 151st–200th for law and legal studies.

In 2018, it was ranked in the top 15 for overall student satisfaction out of English mainstream universities (defined by the university as non-specialist higher education institutions with a survey population of at least 500) for the sixth year running in the National Student Survey.

== Student life ==
=== Student body ===
UCAS Admission Statistics
| | 2022 | 2021 | 2020 | 2019 | 2018 |
|---|---|---|---|---|---|
| Applications (Note: Main scheme applications, International and UK) | 15,860 | 16,945 | 18,345 | 20,895 | 20,855 |
| Accepted | 2,990 | 3,245 | 4,140 | 4,560 | 4,455 |
| Applications/Accepted Ratio | 5.30 | 5.22 | 4.43 | 4.58 | 4.68 |
| Offer Rate (%) (Note: UK domiciled applicants) | 73.3 | 74.5 | 71.1 | 71.7 | 67.3 |
| Average Entry Tariff | —N/a | 126 | 112 | 117 | 107 |

New students entering the university in 2021 had an average of 126 points (the equivalent of just under ABB at A Level). Statistics from the Higher Education Statistics Agency show 95% of UK undergraduates are from state schools or colleges and 11.8% are from low participation neighbourhoods.

The university has a very large population of international students, with over 4,300 students from outside the UK in 2017–18. Essex has an international character with 132 countries represented in its student body. The Times Higher Education World Rankings placed Essex joint 15th for the highest percentage of international students with 44.3% of students coming from outside the UK. Essex is also in the top 20 for 'international outlook' in these rankings – this indicator measures the proportion of staff and students from outside the UK alongside international collaboration on research.

=== Students' Union ===
Some of the major music bands to play in Essex's Students' Union include AC/DC, Blur, Iggy Pop, The Kinks, Can, King Crimson, Pink Floyd, Radiohead, The Smiths and The Specials.

Essex students voted to leave the National Union of Students in an All Student Vote in 2017. A total of 1,026 votes were cast across the three campuses (845 Colchester, 132 in Southend and 46 in Loughton) with 59% in favour of disaffiliating from the national body. In 2018, the student body voted in a referendum to change the way the Students' Union operates with the establishment of a Student Parliament to represent students and hold the officers to account.

The Students' Union media channels operate under the name Rebel. Rebel Radio won the Best Training Initiative award at the I Love Student Radio Awards in 2019.

=== Sport ===
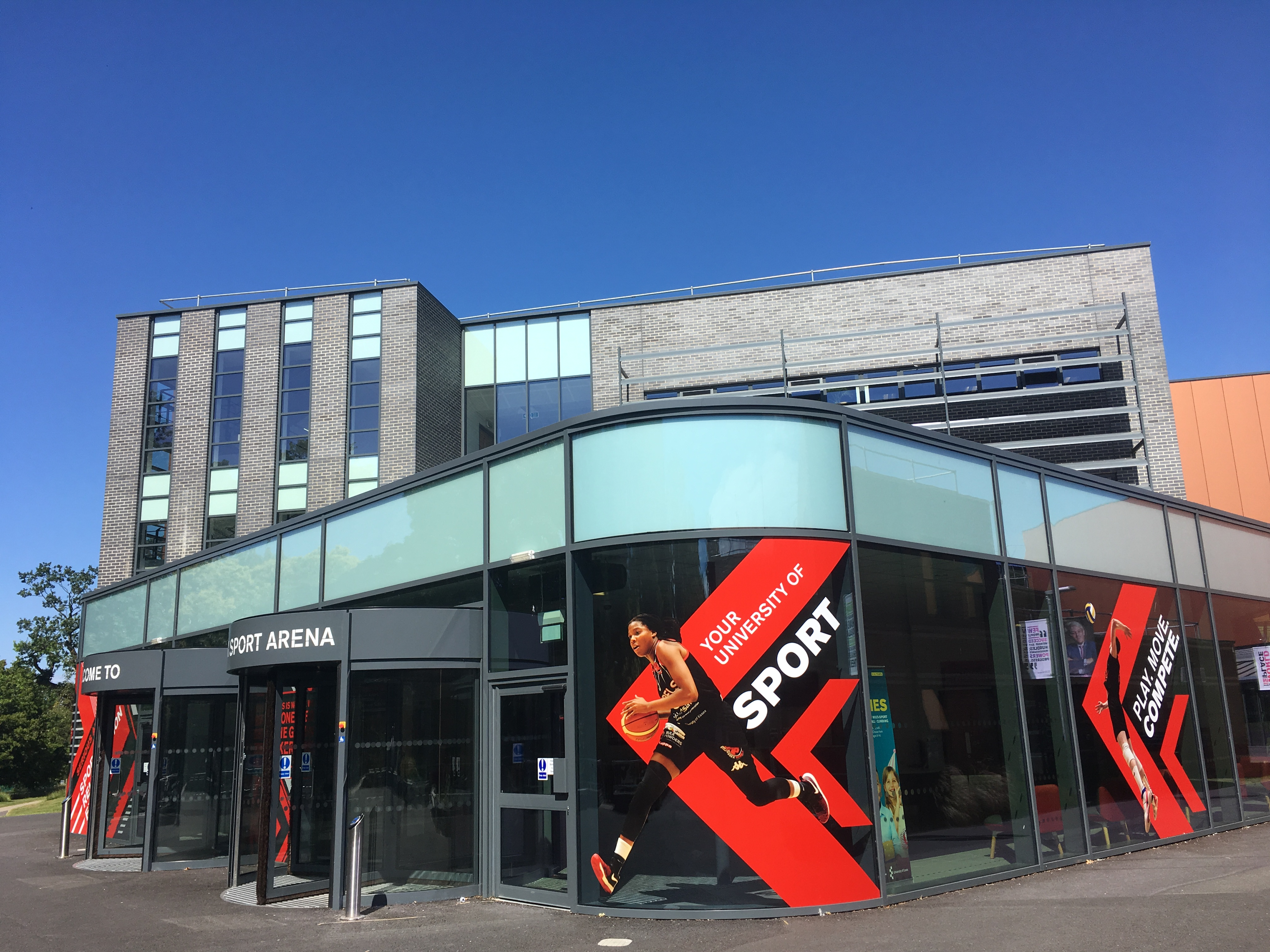
Essex Sport Arena

Sport is an integral part of the living and learning experience for students and staff at Essex. There are a wide range of opportunities to participate in sport and physical activity offered, designed to have broad appeal, and to contribute to health and wellbeing of the campus community and to complement the educational experience offered at the university.

The competitive student sports teams taking part in the British Universities and Colleges Sports competitions are known as the Essex Blades. There are more than 40 clubs covering a range of sports including football, rugby union, American football, netball and cricket, as well as in non-traditional sports such as korfball, ultimate frisbee, pole dancing and cheerleading.

Essex has a focus on a number of 'high-performance' sports including volleyball, basketball, rugby union (particularly rugby sevens), football, tennis, netball and lacrosse. Undergraduate and postgraduate sports scholarships are offered for high-performing students in these focus sports, as well as for students competing in individual events.

National sporting successes include winning the men's team winning the Volleyball England National Student Cup in three consecutive seasons from 2017 to 2019 and the women's basketball team winning the Basketball England National Cup in 2016 and the National League title in 2018. In 2019 the men's volleyball team became the first Essex team to win the British University and Colleges (BUCS) championship national final. Further successes in 2019 included both the men's and women's volleyball team winning the national student cup and the Women's Basketball team retained the BUCS Premier South Title.

The university opened the new Essex Sport Arena at the Colchester Campus in 2018, an international-standard sporting venue with seating for 1,650 spectators. It provides facilities for basketball, volleyball, futsal, table tennis, and badminton, and also hosts the Max Whitlock Gymnastics School. The Essex Sport Arena is also home to the Essex Rebels Women's Basketball programme, which includes a women's team playing in the Women's British Basketball League (WBBL), the first women's sports franchise in the eastern region. The Essex Sport Arena is also host to the Essex Rebels Basketball Academy, run in conjunction with a number of local secondary schools and colleges, and the Essex Rebels Junior Basketball Club, which has teams at under-14, under-16 and under-18 age groups competing in the Basketball England Junior National League.

A number of National Governing Bodies have partnerships with the university including the Football Association, England Rugby, the Lawn Tennis Association, Basketball England, and Volleyball England. Essex is also a "Sport England Talented Athlete Scholarship Scheme Delivery Centre" and one of only 12 accredited 'dual-career' universities. Great Britain and England teams use the university's sporting facilities for training camps, and the facilities also play host to a wide range of sporting competitions such as county and regional championships. In September 2019 Essex was chosen by Basketball England as one of eight regional talent hubs. Essex is also one of 14 universities selected as Tier 1 University Football Hubs which work with the FA and BUCS to support the development of grassroots football. The university also works in partnership with Ipswich Town Football Club in delivering support services for their Women's Super League Academy programme.

The Colchester Campus is also home to one of the longest-established disc golf courses in the UK which has hosted many international championships including the World Team Disc Golf Championship in 2017.

Once a year, 'Derby Day' is a varsity sports contest between the University of Essex clubs and the University of East Anglia sport teams. The event is hosted alternately by Essex and UEA, which Essex has lost 10 times in a row.

== Links with industry ==
=== Knowledge Gateway research and technology park ===
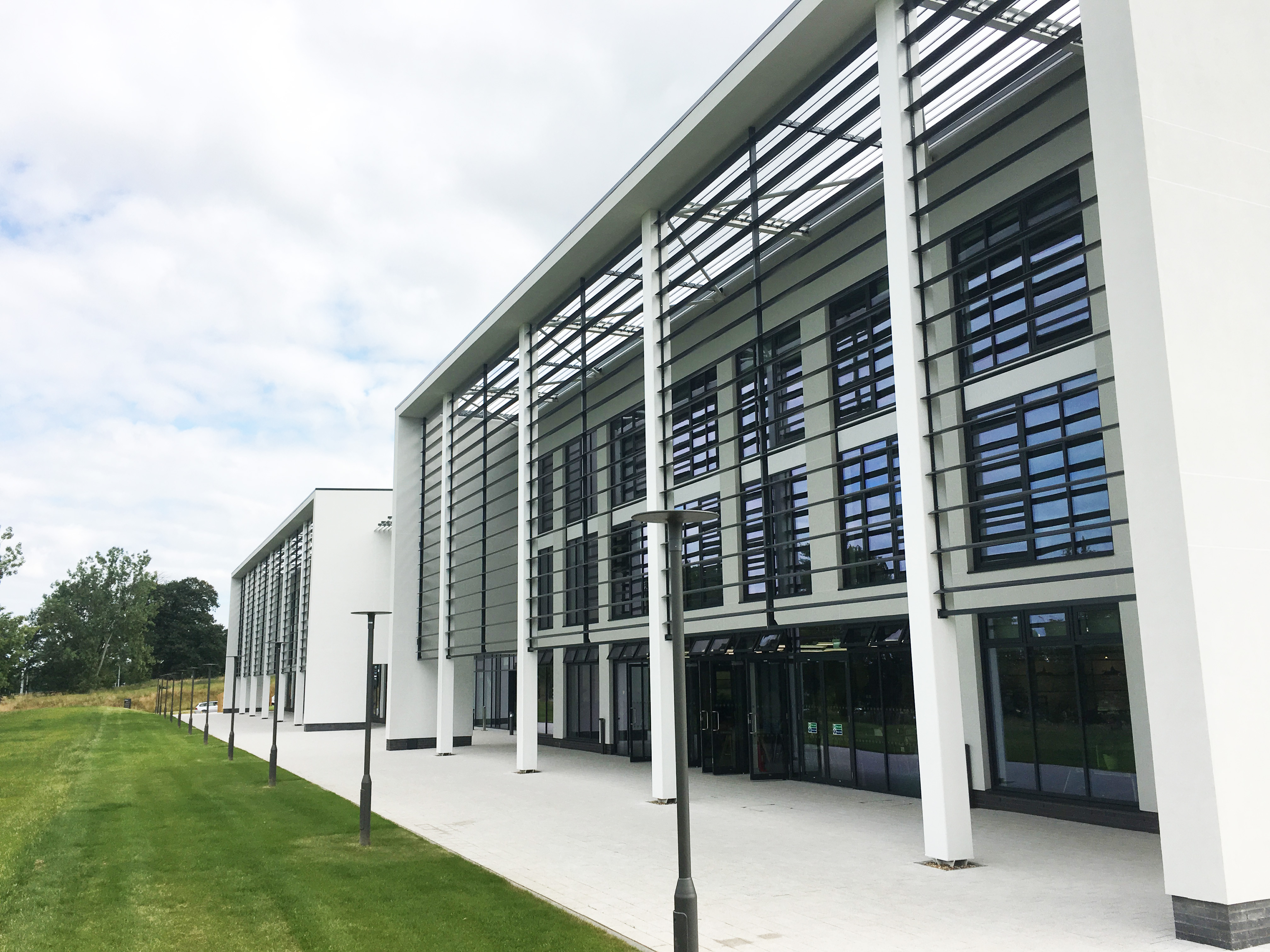
Innovation Centre, Knowledge Gateway

Essex has established the Knowledge Gateway research and technology park at its Colchester Campus with a long-term aim of providing employment for more than 2,000 people. The first phase of Parkside Office Village and the new £21m Essex Business School were the first buildings to be completed. The second phase of Parkside Office Village opened in autumn 2018 and a new £12m Innovation Centre opened in 2019. The innovation Centre will provide a home to more than 50 start-ups and has been supported with substantial funding from Essex County Council and South East Local Enterprise Partnership. The university was named a University Enterprise Zone (UEZ) by the UK Government in September 2019 and received £800,000 towards the £1.3m Accelerating Innovation at the Knowledge Gateway project which is developing a range of initiatives to support businesses to work with the university,

=== Knowledge Transfer Partnerships ===
Essex's Research and Enterprise Office connects businesses with academic expertise and also offers business support. In December 2019 Essex was the leading university in the East of England and London for Knowledge Transfer Partnerships, the flagship Innovate UK programme, and third in the UK with 35 active projects worth a total of £8 million.

== Notable alumni ==
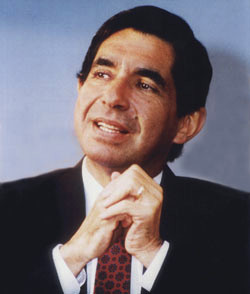
Óscar Arias, former president of Costa Rica, and recipient of the Nobel Peace Prize in 1987

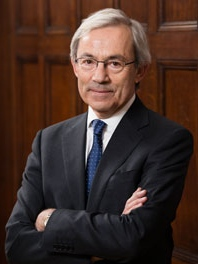
Christopher A. Pissarides, the joint Nobel Prize in Economics recipient in 2010

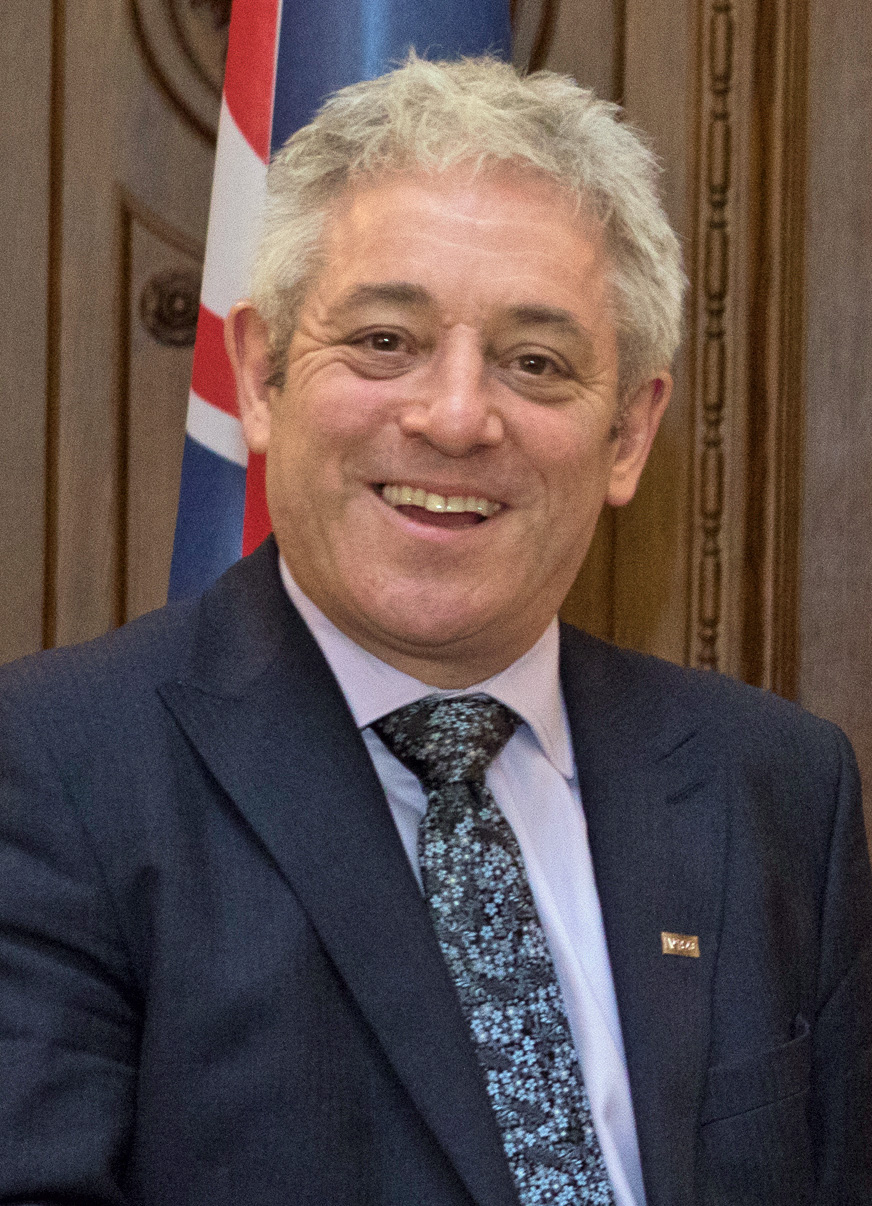
John Bercow, former Speaker of the House of Commons (United Kingdom) (2009–2019)

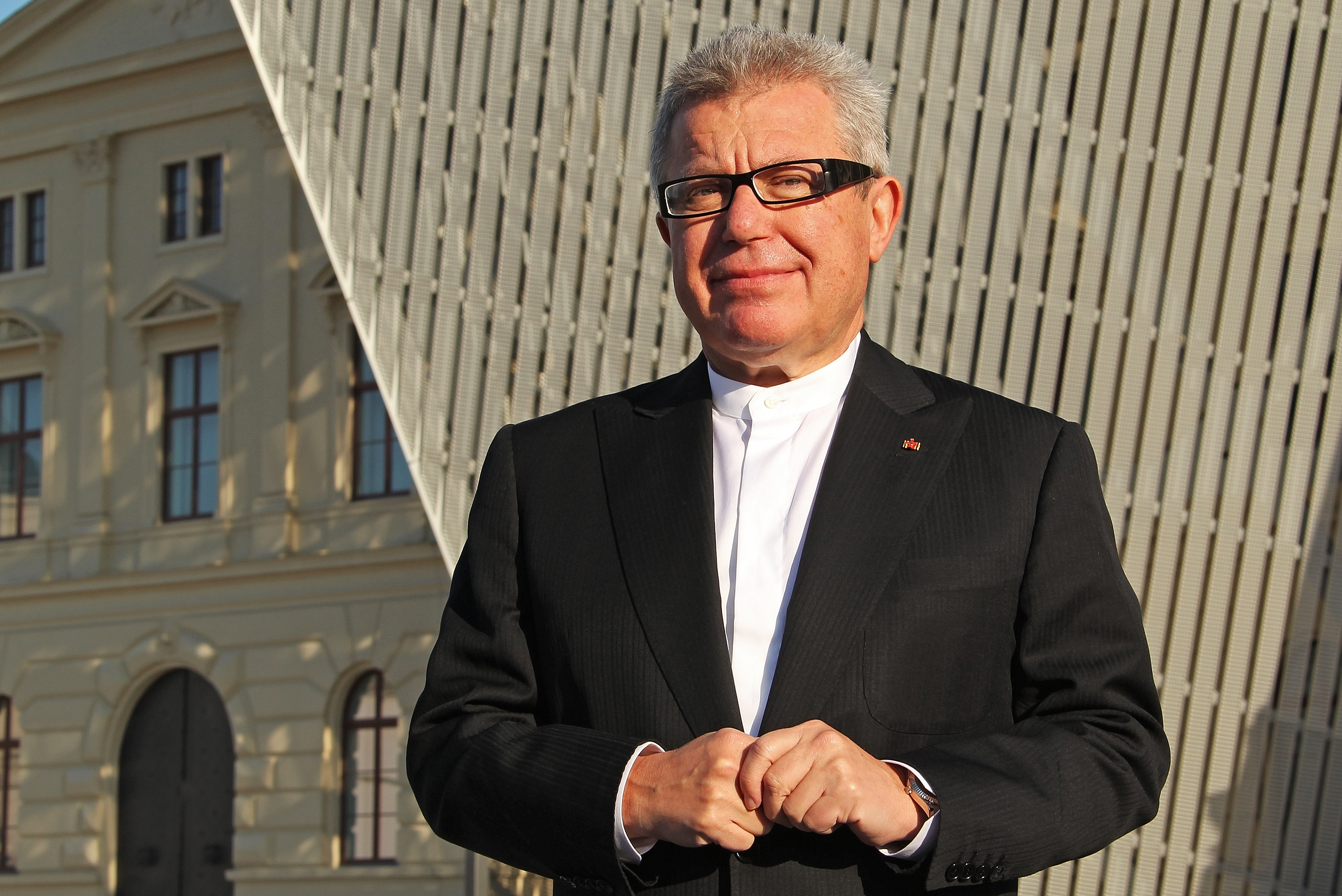
Architect Daniel Libeskind

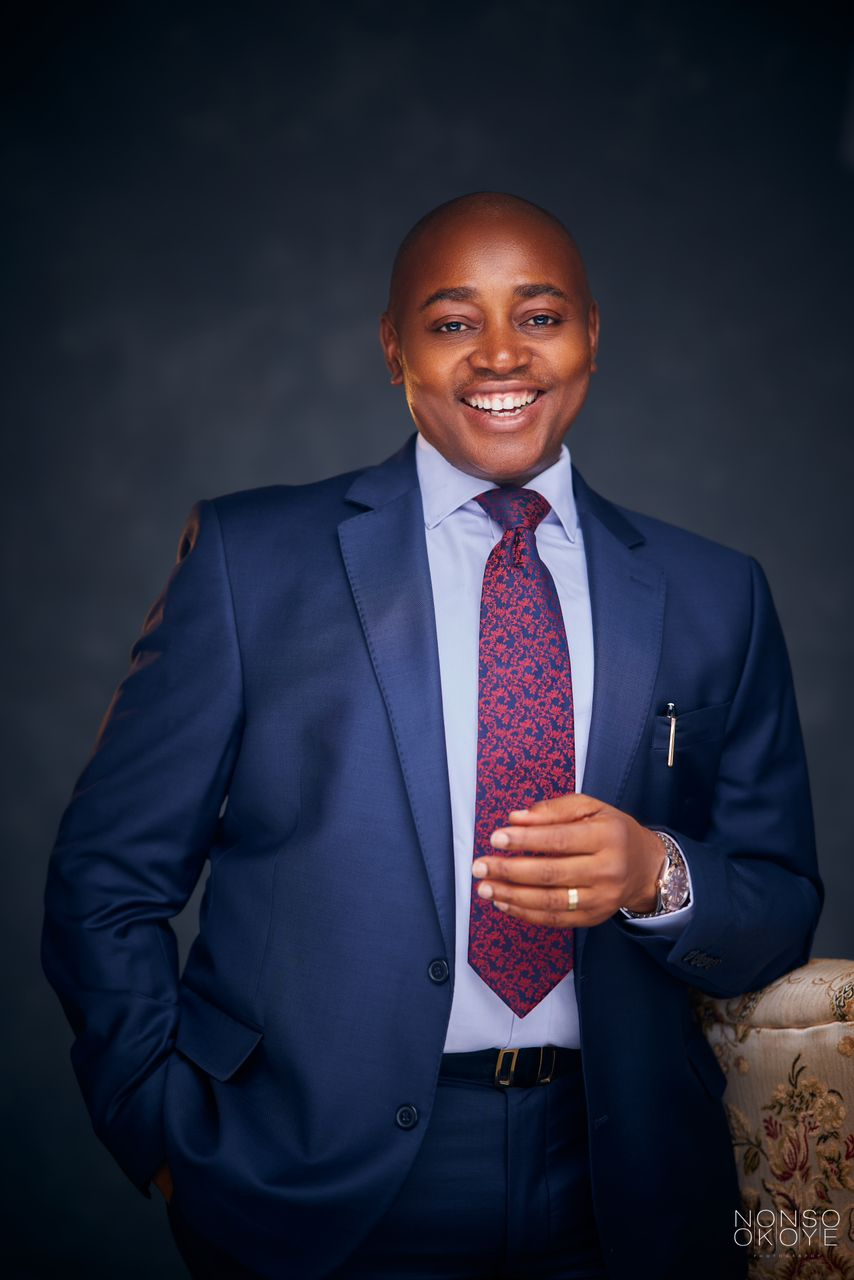
Ifeanyi Ossai, Present Deputy Governor of Enugu State, Nigeria

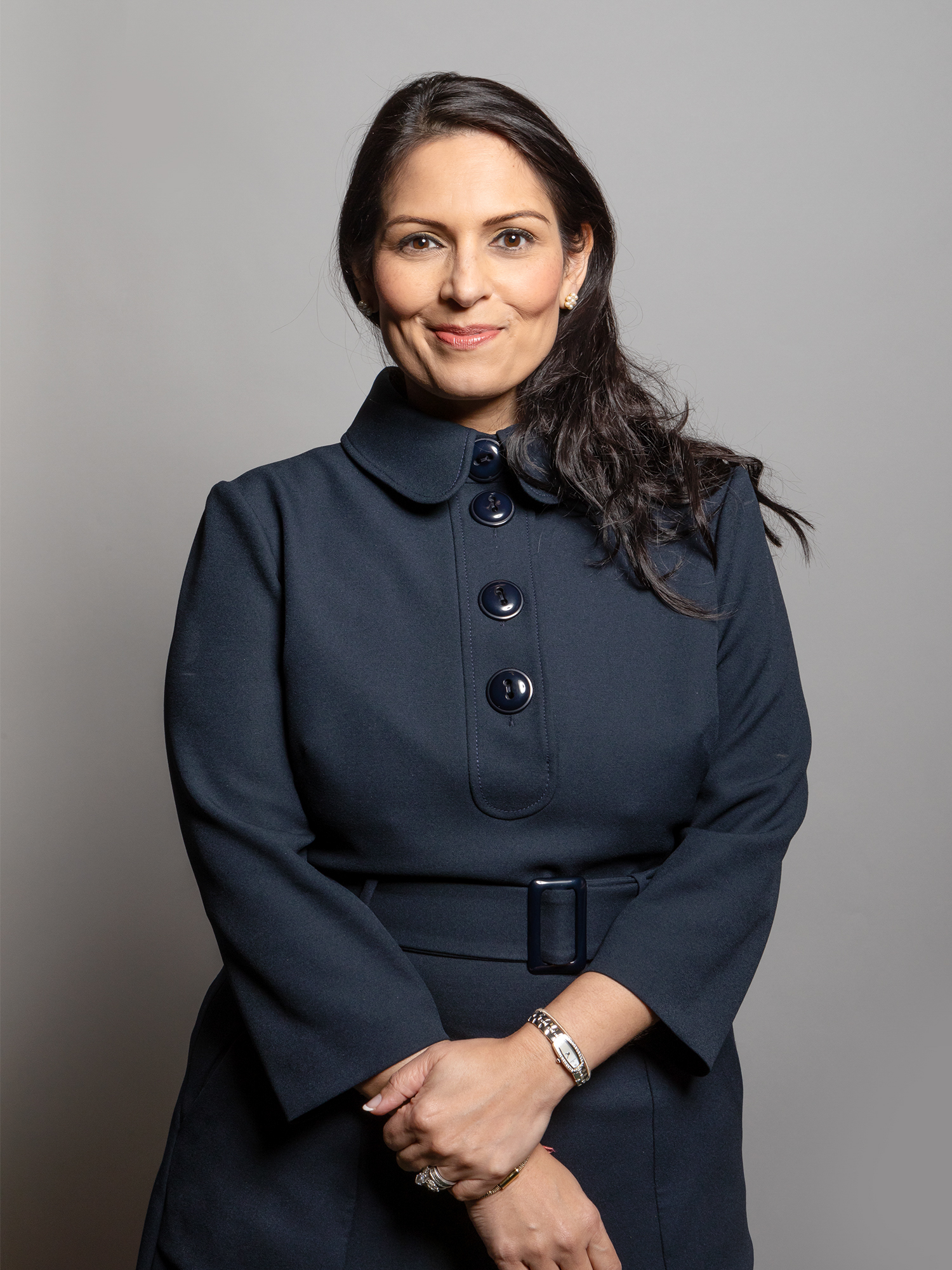
Priti Patel, the former Secretary of State for the Home Department

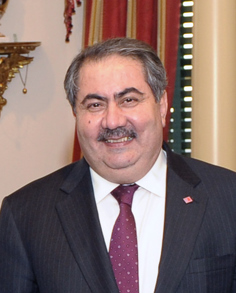
Hoshyar Zebari, former Minister of Foreign Affairs for Iraq

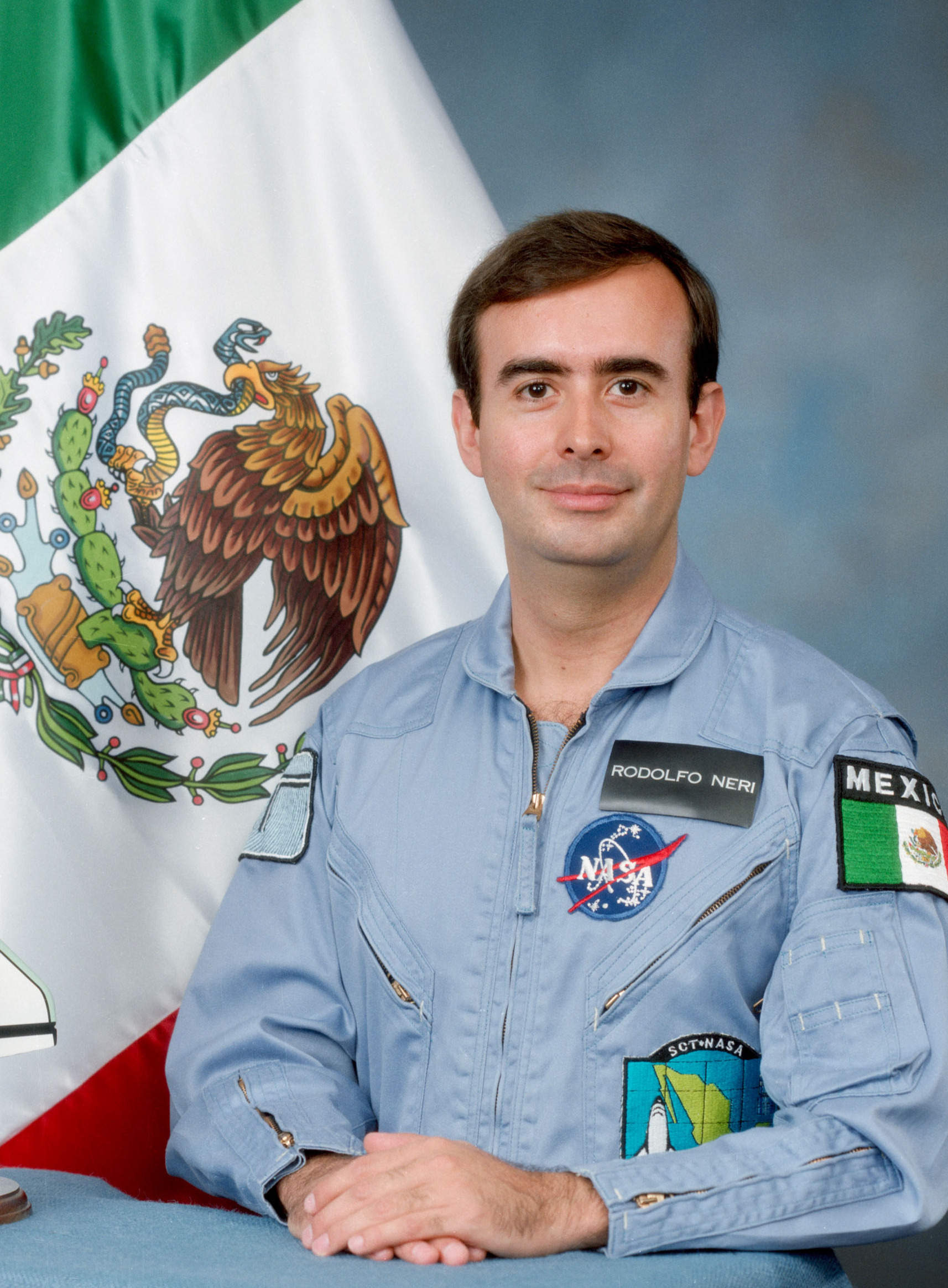
Rodolfo Neri Vela, a Mexican scientist and astronaut who flew aboard a NASA Space Shuttle mission in 1985

Notable alumni in the field of politics and government include Óscar Arias, the former President of Costa Rica, who completed his doctorate in political science in 1973 and received the Nobel Peace Prize in 1987. Kevin Casas Zamora, the former Vice President of Costa Rica, received a MA from Essex in 1993. In October 2010, the Nobel Prize in Economics was jointly awarded to Christopher A. Pissarides, who had completed his BA and MA in economics in the early 1970s.

Other political figures educated at Essex include the foreign ministers of Slovenia (Dimitrij Rupel) and Iraq (Hoshyar Zebari), Conservative Party MPs Virginia Bottomley, Priti Patel and John Bercow, former Speaker of the House of Commons, Labour Party MP Siobhain McDonagh, Labour Party MEP John Howarth, Speaker of Bangladesh's Parliament Shirin Sharmin Chaudhury, Pakistani social activist Omar Asghar Khan, South African politician Thozamile Botha, Rob Whiteman Chief Executive of CIPFA, the Greek economist and politician Yanis Varoufakis, and Singapore social activist James Gomez (MA 1994).

Notable alumni in the field of the humanities and media include Stephen Daldry and Mike Leigh, who both studied at the East 15 Acting School (part of the university since 2001), artistic director William Burdett-Coutts (MA Drama), documentary filmmaker Nick Broomfield, filmmaker David Yates, the TV comedy producer Geoff Posner, the Malaysian poet Kee Thuan Chye, the BBC Correspondent Brian Hanrahan, fashion designer and Fashion Revolution founder Carry Somers, the essayist David Bouchier, the novelists Jonathan Wilson, John Lawton and novelist Ben Okri, a recipient of the Booker Prize. Musicians include jazz guitarist John Etheridge and jazz saxophonist Gilad Atzmon.

In the field of architecture, architect Daniel Libeskind, who was commissioned to rebuild the World Trade Center Site in New York City (MA in the History and Theory of Architecture, 1972). The architectural historian Alberto Pérez-Gómez, subsequently head of the History and Theory of Architecture program at McGill University in Canada (M.A. and PhD, 1975). Notable alumni in law include Mark Watson-Gandy, an award-winning barrister.

Many of the university's graduates have gone on to staff university departments worldwide. These include Erkin Bairam (Economics, Otago), Kusuma Karunaratne (Sinhala, Dean of the Faculty of Graduate Studies, and Vice-Chancellor, Colombo), Farish A. Noor (History, University Malaya), Michael Taylor (Politics, Washington) and Jean Drèze (London School of Economics and Political Science, Delhi School of Economics). It has been estimated that half of the sociology professors in UK Higher Education have completed all or part of their education at Essex.

== Controversies and criticisms ==
=== Academic and professional integrity ===
In her article "Diary: Why I Quit" in the London Review of Books, the novelist and the chair of judges for the 2015 Man Booker International Prize, Dame Marina Warner, compared the University of Essex to "the world of Chinese communist corporatism where enforcers rush to carry out the latest orders from their chiefs in an ecstasy of obedience to ideological principles which they do not seem to have examined, let alone discussed with the people they order to follow them, whom they cashier when they won't knuckle under". Further critique in the article "The Strange Death of the Liberal University", Michael Bailey describes the university as a place that promotes "divisive competition, false economies and philistine instrumentality".

In 2021, following the Reindorf Review, the university was obliged to apologise to Professor Rosa Freedman and Professor Jo Phoenix after their invitation was withdrawn to speak, related to their views on transgender rights. The Vice-Chancellor Professor Anthony Forster said: "The report makes clear that we have made serious mistakes and we need to do our very best to learn from these and to ensure they are not repeated. The review notes the particular responsibility placed on universities to protect freedom of speech within the law, and to ensure that a diversity of voices and views can be heard on our campuses. On behalf of the university, I have issued an open apology to each of Professor Phoenix and Professor Freedman".

=== Allegations of anti-semitism and racial profiling ===
In February 2019, the university was involved in an anti-semitism controversy; a number of students voted against the establishment of the Jewish student society. Staff member Dr Maaruf Ali was dismissed due to the discovery of social media posts which included holocaust denial.

In October 2021, the university received some criticism as 'from the river to the sea' was chanted by protestors outside a talk by Richard Kemp on the Colchester campus.

In January 2021, a black student was allegedly racially profiled by security staff which resulted in the student being confronted by armed police officers. The student was quoted as saying: "Their description of the suspected individual was black, six-feet tall, athletic build, with dreadlocked hair. Being threatened with guns on the campus where my safety is supposed to be provided for is troubling and concerning. How are black students supposed to be safe from racial discrimination and fear of potential death when their biggest threat are those that are supposed to protect them? My hair is far from dreadlocks – and I'm not that tall."

Essex has been criticised for a lack of commitment towards sensitive issues except when it is perceived to be in the interest of its public image. The universities public denouncement of the George Floyd incident was cited as a notable example of the institution taking a stand on social media and then refusing to follow through with their commitment to solidarity when students continued to express concerns on being racially profiled by staff.

== See also ==
- Armorial of UK universities
- List of universities in the United Kingdom
- Plate glass university
