= SISH Institute =

SDH Institute Pte Ltd
- School D'Hospitality
- Type: Private
- Established: 2007
- Director: Chia Tuck Keong
- Location: Singapore, Singapore
- Campus: 51, Anson Road, Anson Centre, #13-51, Singapore 079904
- Website: http://www.sdh.edu.sg

SISH Institute, formerly known as School D’ Hospitality (SDH Institute), is a hospitality and tourism management school located in Singapore. The institute was established in 2007 and is a Private Education Institute in Singapore offering hospitality education. SISH Institute offers Hospitality and Tourism Management programs from Certificate, Diploma, Advanced Diploma, Post-Graduate, Bachelor's Degree to MBA and also professional learning programmes.

On 8 October 2012, after being acquired by KinderWorld, it was renamed as SISH Institute.

== Partners ==
School D’Hospitality has industry links and internship partners like Rasa Sentosa Resorts, Hilton Hotels & Resorts, Holiday Inn, Goodwood Park Hotel, and the Fullerton Hotel. Academic partners include the Association of Business Executives, which is an international examining board and provider of business and management qualifications that lead to degree and master's routes.
