= Kaplan Singapore =

- Parent institution: Kaplan Inc.
- Established: 1989
- Location: Singapore
- Coordinates: 1.3022°N 103.8472°E
- Interactive map of Kaplan Singapore
- Website: kaplan.com.sg

Kaplan Singapore is a for-profit private education institution headquartered in Singapore with other campuses in Hong Kong, Taiwan, and the People's Republic of China. It was known as the Asia Pacific Management Institute (APMI) before it was acquired by Kaplan Inc., a subsidiary of the Graham Holdings Company, in May 2005.

It was established in 1989 as APMI, a regional provider of management education and lifelong learning programs and services.

In May 2005, APMI was acquired by Kaplan Inc., a provider of educational and career services for individuals, schools and businesses with 900,000 students around the globe. APMI headquartered campus and overseas operations have been rebranded under the Kaplan name.

Kaplan Singapore currently has two campuses located at the heart of the city near 6 MRT stations (Bencoolen, Bras Basah, Bugis, Dhoby Ghaut, Little India and Rochor): One at levels 6 to 9 of GR.ID (formerly PoMo) at Selegie Road and the other at level 2 of Wilkie Edge at Wilkie Road.

In 2016, Kaplan announced $90 million to convert all 92 classrooms into smart classrooms. The course was officially launched later in August. In the following, the institution set up six industry advisory boards in different areas to make the curriculum more industry oriented. In addition, it started offering bachelor's degree program in Criminology from Murdoch University, Australia.
