= Five safes =

Decision-making framework

The Five Safes is a framework for helping make decisions about making effective use of data which is confidential or sensitive. It is mainly used to describe or design research access to statistical data held by government and health agencies, and by data archives such as the UK Data Service. It is the dominant framework used to design and describe reserch data access solutions in OECD countries and some others but its not, and is not intended to be, a formal standard.

Two of the Five Safes refer to statistical disclosure control, and so the Five Safes is often used to contrast statistical and non-statistical controls when comparing data management options.

== Concept ==
The Five Safes proposes that data management decisions be considered as solving problems in five 'dimensions': projects, people, settings, data and outputs. The combination of the controls leads to 'safe use'. These are most commonly expressed as questions, for example:

Safe projects	Is this use of the data appropriate?
Safe people	Can the users be trusted to use it in an appropriate manner?
Safe settings	Does the access facility limit unauthorised use?
Safe data	Is there a disclosure risk in the data itself?
Safe outputs	Are the statistical results non-disclosive?

These dimensions are scales, not limits. That is, solutions can have a mix of more or fewer controls in each dimension, but the overall aim of 'safe use' independent of the particular mix. For example, a public use file available for open download cannot control who uses it, where or for what purpose, and so all the control (protection) must be in the data itself. In contrast, a file which is only accessed through a secure environment with certified users can contain very sensitive information: the non-statistical controls allow the data to be 'unsafe'. One academic likened the process to a graphic equalizer, where bass and treble can be combined independently to produce a sound the listener likes, which has proven to be a very useful metaphor. This 2023 Data Foundation webinar is an expert discussion of how the elements interact, including an excellent introductory representation.

There is no 'order' to the Five Safes, in that one is necessarily more important than the others. However, Ritchie argued that the 'managerial' controls (projects, people, setting) should be addressed before the 'statistical' controls (data, output).

The Five Safes concept is associated with other topics which developed from the same programme at ONS, although these are not necessarily implemented. Safe people is associated with 'active researcher management', while safe outputs is linked with principles-based output statistical disclosure control.

The Five Safes is a positive framework, describing what is and is not. The EDRU ('evidence-based, default-open, risk-managed, user-centred') attitudinal model is sometimes used to give a normative context

== The 'data access spectrum' ==
From 2003 the Five Safes was also represented in a simpler form as a 'Data Access Spectrum'. The non-data controls (project, people, setting, outputs) tend to work together, in that organisations often see these as a complementary set of restrictions on access. These can then be contrasted with choices about data anonymisation to present a linear representation of data access options. This presentation is consistent with the idea of 'data as a residual', as well as data protection laws of the time which often characterised data simply as anonymous or not anonymous.

A similar idea had already been developed independently in 2001 by Chuck Humphrey of the Canadian RDC network, the 'continuum of access'. More recently, The Open Data Institute has developed a 'Data Spectrum toolkit' which includes industry-specific examples.

== History and terminology ==
The Five Safes was devised in the winter of 2002/2003 by Felix Ritchie at the UK Office for National Statistics (ONS) to describe its secure remote-access Virtual Microdata Laboratory (VML). It was described at this time as the 'VML Security Model'. This was adopted by the NORC data enclave, and more widely in the US, as the 'portfolio model' (although this is now also used to refer to a slightly different legal/statistical/educational breakdown). In 2012 the framework as was still being referred to as the 'VML security model', but its increasing use among non-UK organisations led to the adoption of the more general and informative phrase 'Five Safes'.

The original framework only had four safes (projects, people, settings and outputs): the framework was used to describe highly detailed data access through a secure environment, and so the 'data' dimension was irrelevant. From 2007 onwards, 'safe data' was included as the framework was used to a describe a wider range of ONS activities. As the US version was based upon the 2005 specification, some US iterations uses have the original four dimensions (eg).

Some discussions, such as the OECD, use the term 'secure' instead 'safe'. However, the use of both these terms can cause presentational problems: less control in a particular dimension could be seen to imply 'unsafe users' or 'insecure settings', for example, which distracts from the main message. Hence, the Australian government uses the term "five data sharing principles".

The 'Anonymisation Decision-Making Framework' uses a framework based on the Five Safes but relabelling "projects", "people", and "settings" as "governance", "agency" and "infrastructure", respectively; "Output" is omitted, and "safe use" becomes "functional anonymisation". There is no reference to the Five Safes or any associated literature. The Australian version was required to include references to the Five Safes, and presented it as an alternative without comment.

== Application ==
The framework has had three uses: pedagogical, descriptive, and design. Since 2016, it has also been used, directly and indirectly in legislation. See for more detailed examples.

=== Pedagogy ===
The first significant use of the framework, other than internal administrative use, was to structure researcher training courses at the UK Office for National Statistics from 2003. UK Data Archive, Administrative Data Research Network, Eurostat, Statistics New Zealand, the Mexican National Institute of Statistics and Geography, NORC, Statistics Canada and the Australian Bureau of Statistics, amongst others, have also used this framework. Most of these courses are for researchers using restricted-access facilities; the Eurostat courses are unusual in that they are designed for all users of sensitive data.

=== Description ===
The framework is often used to describe existing data access solutions (e.g. UK HMRC Data Lab, UK Data Service, Statistics New Zealand) or planned/conceptualised ones (e.g. Eurostat in 2011). An early use was to help identify areas where ONS' still had 'irreducible risks' in its provision of secure remote access.

The framework is mostly used for confidential social science data. To date it appears to have made little impact on medical research planning, although it is now included in the revised guidelines on implementing HIPAA regulations in the US, and by Cancer Research UK and the Health Foundation in the UK. It has also been used to describe a security model for the Scottish Health Informatics Programme.

=== Design ===
In general the Five Safes has been used to describe solutions post-factum, and to explain/justify choices made, but an increasing number of organisations have used the framework to design data access solutions. For example, the Hellenic Statistical Agency developed a data strategy built around the Five Safes in 2016; the UK Health Foundation used the Five Safes to design its data management and training programmes. Use in the private sector is less common but some organisations have incorporated the Five Safes into consulting services.

In 2015 the UK Data Service organized a workshop to encourage data users from the academic and private sectors to think about how to manage confidential research data, using the Five Safes to demonstrate alternative options and best practice.

Early adopters for strategic design use were in Australia: both the Australian Bureau of Statistics and the Australian Department of Social Service used the Five Safes as an ex ante design tool. In 2017 the Australian Productivity Commission recommended adopting a version of the framework to support cross-government data sharing and re-use. This underwent extensive consultation and culminated in the DAT Act 2022.

Since 2020 the Five Safes has been the overriding framework for the design of new secure facilities and data sharing arrangements in the UK for public health and social sciences. This has been promoted by the Office for Statistics Regulation, the UK Statistics Authority, NHS DIgital, and the research funding bodies Administrative Data Research UK and DARE UK.

=== Regulation and legislation ===
Three laws have incorporated the Fives Safes. They are explicit in the South Australian Public Sector (Data Sharing) Act 2016, and implicit in the research provisions of the UK Digital Economy Act 2017. The Australian Data Availability and Transparency Act 2022 renames the Five Safes as the Five Data Sharing Principles.A 2025 statutory review of the DAT Act 2022 found "that the DAT Act has not been effective in achieving its objectives.". The review includes specific references to the challenges associated with the Safes model being implemented in practice "The DAT Act’s current approach to the Five Safes is not strictly a principles-based approach, noting that they are embedded within and enabled through the DAT Act’s very prescriptive, rules-based approach."

== Public engagement ==
The UK Data Service has produced a blog and video for the general public about the use of Five Safes in re-using administrative data. Statistics New Zealand produced a non-technical description, as did ONS for Data Privacy Day 2017. The Australian Federal Government has produced several videos on data sharing, including the Data Sharing Principles.

== The Five Safes and standards ==
Standards may exist for some elements of the Five Safes (for example, legal requirements and/or technical standards for data sharing). The Five Safes itself is not a standard..

The Five Safes was designed as 'a way of thinking about data access'. It was intended as a reasoning tool, not a formal standard. Although some legislation and regulation explicitly or implicitly cites the Five Safes, the Five Safes provides the structure, not the detail. Nevertheless, it is sometimes treated as a specific rule. For example, several UK public sector bodies have required that the data management plans attached to funding applications have to be 'Five Safes compliant', with compliance not being specified. UKBioBank, after a series of high-profile leaks, stressed 'we use the Five Safes framework', although this has been severely criticised as being largely performative.

SATRE (Standardised Architecture for Trusted Research Environments) seeks to provide a more meaningful specification for Trusted Research Environments (TREs; secure research facilities) by a detailed listing of criteria that TREs should seek to meet. SATRE tools support (self-)assessment of compliance to good practice standards, and comes significantly closer to establishing a practical, implementable, general standard. Although without regulatory backing, it has seen growing adoption across the UK, Europe and Latin America.

== Criticisms ==
In the 2020 paper, "Not fit for Purpose: A critical analysis of the ‘Five Safes’", the authors argue that Five Safes is fundamentally flawed due to its disconnection from existing legal protections, its appropriation of safety notions without strong technical measures, and its static view of disclosure risk. Others have argued that the Five Safes has too little content to be useful, or is a box-ticking exercise, or that more 'safes' are needed. Green and Ritchie (2023) provide an extensive review of these critiques and proposals.
