= Dipak Kalra =

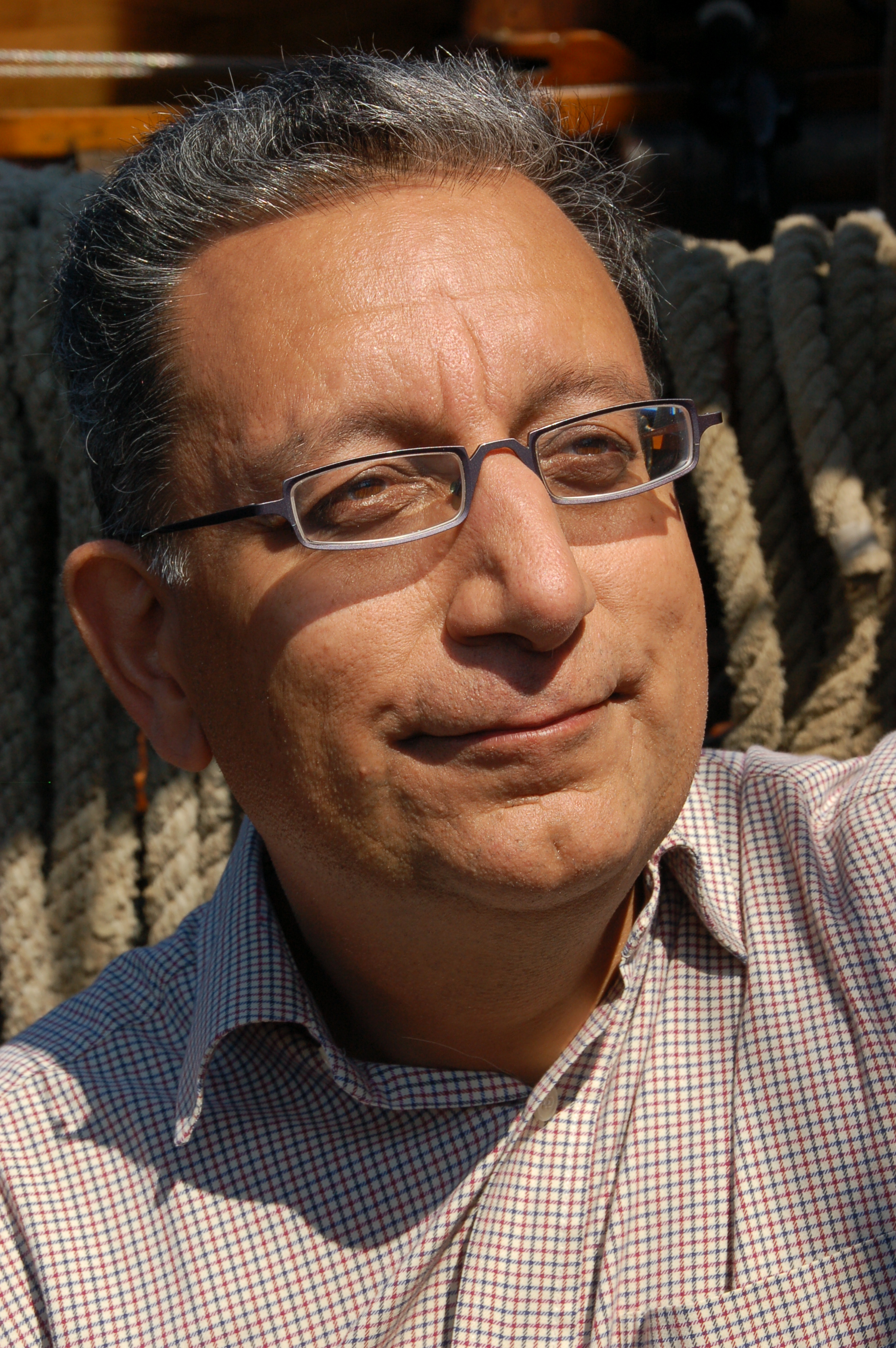
Dipak Kalra in 2013

Dipak Kalra (born 18 July 1959, London, UK) is President of the European Institute for Health Records and of the European Institute for Innovation through Health Data. He undertakes international research and standards development, and advises on adoption strategies relating to Electronic Health Records.

== Education ==
Dipak Kalra studied medicine at Guy's Hospital in London, and specialized in General Practice. He is a Fellow of the Royal College of General Practitioners. He worked as a London GP for a decade before specializing in Health Informatics. He obtained a PhD in Health Informatics in 2003 and is a Fellow of the British Computer Society.

== Career ==
Kalra plays a leading international role in research and development of Electronic Health Record architectures and systems, including the requirements and models needed to ensure the robust long-term preservation of clinical meaning and protection of privacy. He leads the development of CEN (European Committee for Standardization) and ISO (International Organization for Standardization) standards on EHR interoperability, personal health records, EHR requirements, and has contributed to several EHR security and confidentiality standards.

He has led multiple European projects in these areas, including Horizon 2020 and the IMI programme alongside pharma companies, hospitals and ICT companies. He recently co-led a €16m project on the re-use of EHR information for clinical research, EHR4CR, alongside ten global pharma. He is a partner in another IMI project, EMIF, on the development of a European clinical research platform federating multiple population health and cohort studies. Dipak also led an EU Network of Excellence on semantic interoperability, and is a partner in other EU projects on the sustainability of interoperability assets, the transatlantic sharing of patient summaries and quality labelling.

Dipak is President of the European Institute for Innovation through Health Data (www.i-HD.eu). He is also President of the European Institute for Health Records (EuroRec), which is the coordinator or a partner in many EC projects on electronic health record quality and systems accreditation, interoperability and the uses of health data for research. EuroRec leads a network of national ProRec Centres which promote good quality EHR system adoption across Europe.

Dipak Kalra is Professor of Health Informatics at University College London and Visiting Professor of Health Informatics at Ghent University.

Dipak is a member of multiple standards bodies including BSI Group, CEN, ISO and HL7-UK (International HL7 Implementations).

Dipak was a founding Director of the openEHR Foundation, a not-for-profit company which exists to promote and publish, via the Web, the formal specification of requirements for electronic health record information, supporting development of open specifications for health information systems.

Dipak's innovations in EHR architectures have been spun out into a company: Helicon Health, providing cardiovascular chronic disease management services across London.

== Positions held ==
- President, the EuroRec Institute
- President, the European Institute for Innovation through Health Data
- Professor of Health Informatics, Centre for Health Informatics and Multi-professional Education (CHIME), University College London, UK
- Visiting Professor, Ghent University, Belgium
- Honorary Senior Academic General Practitioner, The Whittington Hospital NHS Trust, London
- Director, the openEHR Foundation
- Consultant and advisor on semantic interoperability, to the European Commission, English National Health Service, Ministry of Health in Singapore and Ministry of Health in the Kingdom of Saudi Arabia.

== Research projects ==
- EMIF – 2013-2018 €56m

This project, sponsored through the Innovative Medicines Initiative, comprises almost 50 academic partners and a dozen Pharma partners, developing a generic platform to provide harmonised views across multiple population health (cohort) data sets across Europe and geographically proximal EHR systems. The two initial clinical research areas are dementia and metabolic disorders. Dipak leads work packages on semantic interoperability and ethics, and is a member of the business modeling task force.

- Electronic Health Records for Clinical Research (EHR4CR) – 2011-2016 €16m

This public-private research project, involving 35 partners from academia and 10 Pharma companies. EHR4CR is developing a platform to support remote querying of hospital electronic health records in order to enable more efficient feasibility assessment, recruitment and conduct of clinical trials. Dipak leads the Managing Entity and co-leads two work packages on requirements and on sustainable business models. The project is now spinning out a commercial platform for European scale-up to be run by Custodix, and a not-for-profit institute that Dipak will lead: the European Institute for Innovation through Health Data.

- VALUeHEALTH – 2015-2017 €1m

VALUeHEALTH is establishing how eHealth interoperability can create, deliver, and capture value for all stakeholders. It will develop an evidence-based business plan for self-funding priority pan-European eHealth Services beyond 2020. It will examine the maturity of existing standards and infrastructures, propose organisational changes and incentives, and perform state-of-the-art Cost Benefit Assessments, and from this produce a definitive Business Plan and Strategy for taking forward public-private investment in digital eHealth services. Dipak is the co-ordinator of VALUeHEALTH.

- eStandards – 2015-2017 €1m

eStandards is meant to bring together the leading Standard Developing Organizations in Europe, supported by the eHealth Network and EuroRec. It will develop an evidence-based roadmap for eHealth standards alignment that is endorsed by SDOs, the eHealth Network, and key stakeholders. It will contribute to the European eHealth Interoperability Framework, focusing on clinical content modelling for different paradigms and embedding a quality management system for interoperability testing and certification of eHealth systems. Dipak leads tasks on multi-stakeholder engagement and the development of good practice in clinical information modelling.

- ASSESS-CT – 2015-2016 €1m

ASSESS CT will contribute to better semantic interoperability of eHealth services in Europe, in order to optimise care and to minimise harm in delivery of care. The ASSESS CT project, integrating a broad range of stakeholders, will investigate the fitness of the international clinical terminology SNOMED CT as a potential standard for EU-wide eHealth deployments. It will investigate Member State reasons for adoption/non adoption of SNOMED CT, lessons learned, success factors and the impact of SNOMED CT adoption from a socio-economic viewpoint. Dipak leads the work package to define policy guidance and make the final recommendations of the project.

- SemanticHealthNet – 2012-2015 €3m

SemanticHealthNet will develop a scalable and sustainable pan-European organisational and governance process to achieve this objective across healthcare systems and institutions. The consortium comprises 17 Partners and more than 40 internationally recognised experts, including from United States and Canada, ensuring a global impact. Dipak is the project lead.

- Trillium Bridge – 2013-2015 €270k

This project will design a development and adoption roadmap for sharing patient summaries between the US and the EU, with partners from both sides of the Atlantic. Trillium Bridge supports the Transatlantic eHealth/health IT Cooperation Memorandum of Understanding and Roadmap and the Digital Agenda for Europe in achieving a triple win for eHealth by establishing the foundations of an interoperability bridge to meaningfully exchange patient summaries and electronic health records among the EU and US.

- EXPAND – 2014-2015 €1m

EXPAND - Expanding Health Data Interoperability Services – is a Thematic Network (TN) EC project to progress towards an environment of sustainable cross border eHealth services established at EU level by the Connecting Europe Facility (CEF) and at national level through the deployment of suitable national infrastructures and services.

== Partial bibliography ==
1. Daniel C, Sinaci A, Ouagne D, Sadou E, Declerck G, Kalra D, Charlet J, Forsberg K, Bain L, Mead C, et al., Standard-based EHR-enabled applications for clinical research and patient safety: CDISC - IHE QRPH - EHR4CR & SALUS collaboration, AMIA Joint Summits on Translational Science proceedings AMIA Summit on Translational Science, 2014, p. 19-25
2. Moreno-Conde A, Moner D, Cruz WD, Santos MR, Maldonado JA, Robles M, Kalra D, Clinical information modeling processes for semantic interoperability of electronic health records: systematic review and inductive analysis, JAMIA, Mar 2015
3. Martinez-Costa, C; Cornet, R; Karlsson, D; Schulz, S; Kalra, D (2015). "Semantic enrichment of clinical models towards semantic interoperability. The heart failure summary use case". Journal of the American Medical Informatics Association. 22 (3): 565–76. doi:10.1093/jamia/ocu013. PMC 11737585. PMID 25670758.
4. De Moor G, Sundgren M, Kalra D, Schmidt A, Dugas M, Claerhout B, Karakoyun T, Ohmann C, Lastic PY, Ammour N, et al., Using electronic health records for clinical research: The case of the EHR4CR project, J Biomed Inform, Feb 2015, vol.53 p. 162-173
5. Elliot MJ, Kalra D, Singleton P and Smith D, Practical Privacy Controls when Re-using Medical Data for Research, Journal of Healthcare Information Management, 2014, vol.28(4), p. 50-57
6. Kalra D, Artmann J, Stroetmann V, Boye N, The eHealth Contribution to Person-Centred Care, In Rosenmoller M, Whitehouse D, Wilson P. Managing EHealth: From Vision to Reality, Palgrave Macmillan, UK, .
7. Morrison, Zoe; Fernando, Bernard; Kalra, Dipak; Cresswell, Kathrin; Robertson, Ann; Sheikh, Aziz (2014). "The collection and utilisation of patient ethnicity data in general practices and hospitals in the United Kingdom: A qualitative case study". Journal of Innovation in Health Informatics. 21 (3): 118–31. doi:10.14236/jhi.v21i3.63. hdl:20.500.11820/ea01b0e8-e2c1-460b-bafe-a387cadbb67c. PMID 25207615.
8. Martínez-Costa, C; Kalra, D; Schulz, S (2014). "Improving EHR semantic interoperability: Future vision and challenges". Studies in Health Technology and Informatics. 205: 589–93. PMID 25160254.
9. Chronaki, C; Estelrich, A; Cangioli, G; Melgara, M; Kalra, D; Gonzaga, Z; Garber, L; Blechman, E; Ferguson, J; Kay, S (2014). "Interoperability standards enabling cross-border patient summary exchange". Studies in Health Technology and Informatics. 205: 256–60. PMID 25160185.
10. Tapuria, A; Evans, M; Austin, T; Lea, N; Kalra, D (2014). "Development and evaluation of a memory clinic information system". Studies in Health Technology and Informatics. 205: 106–10. PMID 25160155.
11. Fernando, Bernard; Morrison, Zoe; Kalra, Dipak; Cresswell, Kathrin; Sheikh, Aziz (2014). "Approaches to Recording Drug Allergies in Electronic Health Records: Qualitative Study". PLOS ONE. 9 (4) e93047. Bibcode:2014PLoSO...993047F. doi:10.1371/journal.pone.0093047. PMC 3989180. PMID 24740090.
12. Frandji, Bruno; Kalra, Dipak; Jaulent, Marie-Christine (2014). "A CDSS Supporting Clinical Guidelines Integrated and Interoperable within the Clinical Information System". Innovations in Intelligent Machines-4. Studies in Computational Intelligence. Vol. 514. pp. 233–55. doi:10.1007/978-3-319-01866-9_7. ISBN 978-3-319-01865-2.
13. Tate, A. Rosemary; Kalra, Dipak; Boggon, Rachael; Beloff, Natalia; Puri, Shivani; Williams, Tim (2014). "Data quality in European primary care research databases. Report of a workshop held in London September 2013" (PDF). IEEE-EMBS International Conference on Biomedical and Health Informatics (BHI). Vol. 13. IEEE/ACM Transactions on Computational Biology and Bioinformatics. pp. 549–56. doi:10.1109/BHI.2014.6864310. ISBN 978-1-4799-2131-7. PMID 27295638. S2CID 11849383.
14. Tapuria, Archana; Kalra, Dipak; Kobayashi, Shinji (2013). "Contribution of Clinical Archetypes, and the Challenges, towards Achieving Semantic Interoperability for EHRs". Healthcare Informatics Research. 19 (4): 286–92. doi:10.4258/hir.2013.19.4.286. PMC 3920041. PMID 24523993.
15. Dugas M, Breil B, Trinczek B, Stausberg J, Kalra D, Open metadata for medical data models. Studies in health technology and informatics, 2013 Jan 192:1257
16. Rodrigues JM, Schulz S, Rector A, Spackman K, Ustün B, Chute C, Della Mea V, Millar J, Brand Persson K, Kalra D, Do we need a Common Ontology between ICD 11 and SNOMED CT to ensure Seamless Re-Use and Semantic Interoperability?, Studies in health technology and informatics, 2013 Jan 192:1234
17. Morrison, Zoe; Fernando, Bernard; Kalra, Dipak; Cresswell, Kathrin; Sheikh, Aziz (2014). "National evaluation of the benefits and risks of greater structuring and coding of the electronic health record: Exploratory qualitative investigation". Journal of the American Medical Informatics Association. 21 (3): 492–500. doi:10.1136/amiajnl-2013-001666. PMC 3994848. PMID 24186957.
18. Austin, Tony; Sun, Shanghua; Hassan, Taher; Kalra, Dipak (2013). "Evaluation of ISO EN 13606 as a result of its implementation in XML". Health Informatics Journal. 19 (4): 264–80. doi:10.1177/1460458212473993. PMC 4107818. PMID 23995217.
19. Kalra, D; Fernando, B (2013). "A review of the empirical evidence of the healthcare benefits of personal health records". Yearbook of Medical Informatics. 8: 93–102. PMID 23974554.
20. Coorevits, P; Sundgren, M; Klein, G. O; Bahr, A; Claerhout, B; Daniel, C; Dugas, M; Dupont, D; Schmidt, A; Singleton, P; De Moor, G; Kalra, D (2013). "Electronic health records: New opportunities for clinical research". Journal of Internal Medicine. 274 (6): 547–60. doi:10.1111/joim.12119. PMID 23952476. S2CID 14052862.
21. Tapuria A, Austin T, Sun S, Lea N, Iliffe S, Kalra D, Ingram D, Patterson D, Clinical advantages of decision support tool for anticoagulation control, IEEE Point-Of-Care Healthcare Technologies (PHT), 2013, p. 331-334
22. Fitzsimons, Mary; Dunleavy, Brendan; o'Byrne, Patricia; Dunne, Mary; Grimson, Jane; Kalra, Dipak; Normand, Charles; Delanty, Norman (2013). "Assessing the quality of epilepsy care with an electronic patient record". Seizure. 22 (8): 604–10. doi:10.1016/j.seizure.2013.03.002. PMID 23537634.
23. Denaxas, S. C; George, J; Herrett, E; Shah, A. D; Kalra, D; Hingorani, A. D; Kivimaki, M; Timmis, A. D; Smeeth, L; Hemingway, H (2012). "Data Resource Profile: Cardiovascular disease research using linked bespoke studies and electronic health records (CALIBER)". International Journal of Epidemiology. 41 (6): 1625–38. doi:10.1093/ije/dys188. PMC 3535749. PMID 23220717.
24. Cresswell, Kathrin; Morrison, Zoe; Sheikh, Aziz; Kalra, Dipak (2012). "'There Are Too Many, but Never Enough': Qualitative Case Study Investigating Routine Coding of Clinical Information in Depression". PLOS ONE. 7 (8) e43831. Bibcode:2012PLoSO...743831C. doi:10.1371/journal.pone.0043831. PMC 3427209. PMID 22937106.
25. Fernando, Bernard; Kalra, Dipak; Morrison, Zoe; Byrne, Emma; Sheikh, Aziz (2012). "Benefits and risks of structuring and/or coding the presenting patient history in the electronic health record: Systematic review". BMJ Quality & Safety. 21 (4): 337–46. doi:10.1136/bmjqs-2011-000450. PMID 22328458. S2CID 20135691.
26. Ahn, Sunju; Huff, Stanley M; Kim, Yoon; Kalra, Dipak (2013). "Quality metrics for detailed clinical models". International Journal of Medical Informatics. 82 (5): 408–17. doi:10.1016/j.ijmedinf.2012.09.006. PMID 23089521.
27. Sun, Shanghua; Austin, Tony; Kalra, Dipak (2012). "A Data Types Profile Suitable for Use with ISO EN 13606". Journal of Medical Systems. 36 (6): 3621–35. doi:10.1007/s10916-012-9837-z. PMID 22399066. S2CID 17773713.
28. Woollard, Matthew; Lyon, Liz; Patel, Manjula; Lavoie, Brian; Kalra, Dipak; Hardman, Catherine; Duke, Monica; Beagrie, Neil (2012). "The KRDS Benefit Analysis Toolkit: Development and Application". International Journal of Digital Curation. 7 (2): 64–7. doi:10.2218/ijdc.v7i2.230.
29. Kalra D, Schmidt A, Potts HWW, Dupont D, Sundgren M, De Moor G, on behalf of the EHR4CR Research consortium, Case Report from the EHR4CR Project: A European Survey on Electronic Health Records Systems for Clinical Research, iHealth Connections, 2011; 1(2)p. 108-113.
30. Kalra D, Musen M, Smith B, Ceusters W, De Moor G, ARGOS Policy Brief on Semantic Interoperability, Stud Health Technol Inform, 2011, 170, p. 1-15
31. Austin, Tony; Lim, Yin; Nguyen, David; Kalra, Dipak (2011). "Design of an Electronic Healthcare Record Server Based on Part 1 of ISO EN 13606". Journal of Healthcare Engineering. 2 (2): 143–60. doi:10.1260/2040-2295.2.2.143.
32. Iliffe, Steve; Curry, Lisa; Kharicha, Kalpa; Rait, Greta; Wilcock, Jane; Lowery, David; Tapuria, Archana; Kalra, Dipak; Ritchie, Craig (2011). "Developing a Dementia Research Registry: A descriptive case study from North Thames DeNDRoN and the EVIDEM programme". BMC Medical Research Methodology. 11 (1): 9. doi:10.1186/1471-2288-11-9. PMC 3038162. PMID 21272296.
33. Kalra D, Health informatics 3.0, Yearbook Med Inform, 2011, 6(1), p. 8-14
34. Van Der Linden, Helma; Kalra, Dipak; Hasman, Arie; Talmon, Jan (2009). "Inter-organizational future proof EHR systems". International Journal of Medical Informatics. 78 (3): 141–60. doi:10.1016/j.ijmedinf.2008.06.013. PMID 18760661.

ISO International standards (development led by Dipak)

1. Kalra D, Datta G, 2011, ISO TR 14292 Personal Health Records - Definition, scope and context
2. Kalra D, Sawatsky E, 2011, ISO TS 14265 Classification of purposes for processing personal health information
3. Kalra D, 2010, ISO 18308 Requirements for an Electronic Health Record Reference Architecture
4. Kalra D, 2010, ISO/EN 13606 Electronic Health Record Communication Part 5: Interface Specification
5. Kalra D, 2009, ISO 13606 Electronic Health Record Communication Part 3: Reference Archetypes and Term Lists
6. Kalra D, 2009, ISO TS 13606 Electronic Health Record Communication Part 4: Security
7. Kalra D, Beale T, Lloyd D, Heard S, 2008, ISO 13606 Electronic Health Record Communication Part 2: Archetype Interchange Specification
8. Kalra D, Lloyd D., 2008, ISO 13606 Electronic Health Record Communication Part 1: Reference Model
