= Fax (disambiguation) =

Fax, short for facsimile, is a telecommunications technology used to transfer copies of documents over the telephone network.

Fax or FAX may also refer to:

== Media ==
- Fax (Argentine TV show), between 1991 and 1992
- Fax (Pern), a character in Anne McCaffrey's Dragonriders of Pern series
- Fax (TV series), BBC children's show between 1985 and 1988
- Fax (video game), a trivia arcade game

== Other ==
- FAX +49-69/450464, a German record company releasing ambient music
- FlyAsianXpress, commonly known as FAX, an airline operating in Malaysia
- Fresno Area Express, a public transit agency operating in Fresno, California
- Fax (surname), various people
- fax, ISO 639 code for the Fala language
- Fax, a mostly obsolete term for head hair

== See also ==
- FACS (disambiguation)
- Faxe, a town in Denmark
