= ESDS Longitudinal =

ESDS Longitudinal is a specialist service of the Economic and Social Data Service (ESDS), led by the UK Data Archive at the University of Essex and the ESRC United Kingdom Longitudinal Studies Centre (ULSC), jointly funded by the Joint Information Systems Committee (JISC) and the Economic and Social Research Council (ESRC).

In July 2012, the ESRC announced that all of ESDS will join the UK Data Service, to be established as of October 1, 2012.

== Service overview ==
The service currently provides an online download service, specialist user support which links up with specialist support provided by the Centre for Longitudinal Studies (CLS), training and workshops and a range of data enhanced longitudinal collections. Such as:

- 1970 British Cohort Study (BCS70)
- British Household Panel Survey (BHPS)
- English Longitudinal Study of Ageing (ELSA)
- Families and Children Study (FACS)
- Longitudinal Study of Young People in England (LSYPE)
- Millennium Cohort Study (MCS)
- National Child Development Study (NCDS)

It also encourages linkage with other datasets not directly supported by ESDS, such as the ONS Longitudinal Study and, in conjunction with the ESRC, works to facilitate access to new longitudinal data collections.

Recently, ESDS Longitudinal has undertaken a data audit of two major longitudinal investments by the Medical Research Council (UK): the Avon Longitudinal Study of Parents and Children (ALSPAC) and the National Study of Health and Development (also known as the 1946 Birth Cohort Study).

Both studies are currently in preparation for improved access for secondary users.
