= Archaeology Data Service =

Digital repository for UK heritage data

Coordinates: 53.962364°N 1.086633°W

- ADS logo
- Abbreviation: ADS
- Formation: 1996
- Legal status: Higher Education body
- Location: York Guildhall, York, England
- Region served: UK
- Director: Professor Julian D. Richards
- Main organ: ADS Management Committee
- Parent organization: University of York
- Affiliations: AHRC, HEIRNET, FISH, A&H Data Centres (NoC)
- Staff: 11
- Website: http://archaeologydataservice.ac.uk

The Archaeology Data Service (ADS) is an open access digital archive for archaeological research outputs. It is located in York Guildhall, at the University of York. Originally intended to curate digital outputs from archaeological researchers based in the UK's Higher Education sector, the ADS also holds archive material created under the auspices of national and local government as well as in the commercial archaeology sector. The ADS carries out research, most of which focuses on resource discovery, cross-searching and interoperability with other relevant archives in the UK, Europe and the United States of America.

The Archaeology Data Service is listed in the Registry of Research Data Repositories re3data.org.

== History ==
In the late 1990s a consensus developed in the field of archaeology that archaeological data in digital form was highly fragile due to both an inadequate understanding of technical threats to its sustainability and the lack of an infrastructure to preserve it in the long term. In April 1996 a consortium comprising eight Departments of Archaeology from UK Universities joined forces with the Council for British Archaeology (CBA) to put a proposal to the Arts and Humanities Data Service Executive to establish an Archaeology Data Service. This service was to host a digital archive for archaeologists and to provide advice and guidance to the archaeological community on how to create and manage their digital datasets. As a result, the ADS was established at the University of York Department of Archaeology in September 1996 with two full-time members of staff and under the directorship of Professor Julian D. Richards. From 1996 until 2008 the ADS hosted AHDS Archaeology, a subject centre devoted to archaeology funded by the Arts and Humanities Research Council via the AHDS. The AHDS closed in March 2008 as a result of a controversial decision by the AHRC to withdraw funding. The ADS now receives funding directly from AHRC, rather than through the AHDS, it is also funded by other Higher Education and cultural heritage sector organisations including the European Union.

The original consortium members were the archaeology departments of the following Universities:

- The University of Birmingham
- The University of Bradford
- The University of Glasgow
- The University of Kent at Canterbury
- The University of Leicester
- The University of Oxford
- The University of Newcastle
- The University of York

and

- The Council for British Archaeology

The University of Southampton and University College London were also involved in early discussions about the formation of a digital archive for archaeological material, and joined the consortium at an early stage.

== Governance ==
The ADS is run on a day-to-day basis by a director and a deputy director, however it is managed by a committee meeting bi-annually consisting of representatives of funding bodies, representatives of user communities and the ADS internal Management Group, comprising the director, deputy director, European project manager, communications and access manager, and the systems manager. The current (2020) chair of the management committee is professor Sam Turner from the University of Newcastle.

== The Archive ==
=== Content ===
The ADS holds the digital outputs of numerous archaeological excavations or other research activities including some very well known sites such as Stonehenge and Sutton Hoo. Much of the archive material can be grouped together under 'programme' headings such as the Channel Tunnel Rail Link (CTRL) which involved over 100 different archaeological interventions. The ADS acts as the mandated digital archive for archaeological research, of any kind, funded by the AHRC, and also for English Heritage administered funds such as the Aggregates Levy Sustainability Fund (ALSF). The online journal Internet Archaeology's content is archived by the ADS and a number of journal series from learned societies such as the Society of Antiquaries of Scotland, have older digital versions of their journals made freely available from the ADS site. The ADS is the largest single source of archived grey literature, with over 20,000 examples available in its Library of Unpublished Fieldwork. Access to grey literature in the archaeological context has become a significant concern, especially in academia, in recent years.

=== Advice ===
The ADS offer advice to data creators on procedures and formats, including advice on the writing of Technical Appendices for AHRC applications. The website hosts a series of Guides to Good Practice (G2GP) on the following archaeological topics:

- Geographic information systems
- Archiving aerial photography and remote sensing data
- Digital archives from excavation and fieldwork
- Geophysical data in archaeology
- CAD
- Creating and using virtual reality, a guide for the arts and humanities

All these G2GP were revised in 2012 funded in part by English Heritage and the US based Digital Antiquity project.

=== Procedures ===
The ADS archive is intended to follow the Open Archival Information System reference model, which is an ISO for data archive systems. There are no constraints on access although users must click a web form to accept the ADS Terms and Conditions, in essence these state that the all copyright is retained by the original data depositor, but they permit its reuse for teaching, learning and research purposes, but not commercial purposes. Off site back-up storage for the ADS archive is held both at the University of York's computer services and at the UK Data Archive in Essex.

=== Interface ===
Beyond acting as a simple repository for datasets, the ADS has a number of interactive interfaces into complex archives including database search interfaces, WebGIS and interactive image galleries. The main search mechanism for the ADS catalogue, ArchSearch, contains aggregated resource discovery metadata for the national monument inventories of England, Scotland and Wales (hosted by English Heritage, the RCAHMS and the RCAHMW) as well as numerous Historic Environment Records HERs. The ADS hosts a number of datasets, such as the Excavation Index, that are made available externally as web services and consumed by English Heritage's Heritage Gateway search engine.

== Projects ==
=== UK based projects ===
Significant projects undertaken by the ADS in the UK include:

- The OASIS project (Online AccesS to the Index of archaeological investigationS) funded by English Heritage and Historic Scotland, this project is being expanded to include a C14 extension in collaboration with Historic Scotland and the RCAHMS.
- England's Rock Art a site for the reporting and exploration of prehistoric rock art in the Northumberland area of England funded English Heritage and Northumberland County Council
- Archaeotools, funded by the Jisc-AHRC-EPSRC eScience programme, this project looks at the potential for Natural Language Processing for harvesting resource discovery metadata from archaeological documentation, and faceted classification as an interface technology into archaeological catalogues. This project is collaboration with the department of computer science at the University of Sheffield.

=== European funded projects ===
Significant EU funded projects include:

- Virtual Exploration of Underwater Sites (VENUS), funded by the European Union Sixth Framework Programme (FP6) this project looks at the potential for automated photogrammetry of maritime archaeology sites including the use of ROV's and AUV's
- The preparing DARIAH project is funded by the European Union European Strategy Forum on Research Infrastructures (ESFRI) Roadmap, Seventh Framework Programme (FP7). This project is scoping a pan-European digital infrastructure of the Arts and Humanities. Under this project the ADS will be extending cross searching of monument inventories in a number of countries, developing an earlier cross-searching project called ARENA.
- Archaeology of Contemporary Europe (ACE) is part of the European Commission's Culture Programme, among other functions, under this project the ADS is building and hosting a UDDI registry for the Historic Environment Information Resources Network (HEIRNET).
- CARARE: A best practice network funded by the European Commission's ICT Policy Support Programme. CARARE brings together heritage agencies and organisations, archaeological museums and research institutions and specialist digital archives from all over Europe to establish a service that will make digital content for Europe's unique archaeological monuments and historic sites interoperable with Europeana. It aims to add the 3D and virtual reality content to Europeana. The ADS have specific responsibility for investigating the issues surrounding the long-term sustainability of the CARARE aggregation service.
- LoCloud (Local Content in a Europeana Cloud) is a best practice network which began in March 2013 and will run for three years. It is coordinated by the Norsk Kulturrad and made up of 33 partners across 25 European countries. LoCloud follows directly on from the aforementioned CARARE project and EuropeanaLocal, another recently completed best practice network project, funded under the e-Contentplus programme. It played an important role in ensuring the digital content provided by Europe's local and regional cultural institutions were represented in Europeana. The intention of LoCloud is to combine the metadata mapping methodology of CARARE with cloud computing technology, making it easier for small to medium-sized heritage organisations to make their contents accessible via Europeana.
- ARIADNE (Advanced Research Infrastructure for Archaeological Dataset Networking) brings together and integrates existing archaeological research data infrastructures so that researchers can use the various distributed datasets and new and powerful technologies as an integral component of the archaeological research methodology. There is now a large availability of archaeological digital datasets that all together span different periods, domains and regions; more are continuously created as a result of the increasing use of IT. They are the accumulated outcome of the research of individuals, teams and institutions, but form a vast and fragmented corpus and their potential has been constrained by difficult access and non-homogenous perspectives.

=== Other international projects ===
- The ADS is a participant in 'Digital Antiquity' a Mellon funded project as well as the Jisc/National Endowment for the Humanities funded project which is intended to investigate data cross-searching and/or interoperability between, for example, individual site zooarchaeological databases.
