= Matthew Woollard =

British historian and data expert

- Born: May, 1967; London, UK
- Education: Goldsmiths, University of London; Institute of Historical Research; University of Essex
- Employer: University of Essex
- Awards: OBE

Matthew Woollard OBE (born May 1967) is Professor of data policy and governance in the UK Data Archive at the University of Essex. He served as Director of the UK Data Service and UK Data Archive from 2010 to 2023.

== Early life and education ==
Woollard was brought up in St John’s Wood in London. He was educated at The Hall School, Hampstead, Dean Close Junior School and Stowe School, before attending Goldsmiths, University of London, where he gained a BA (Hons) degree in history.

In 1991, he received an MA with distinction from the Institute of Historical Research. He received his PhD in 2005 from the University of Essex with a thesis on the development of occupational classification in the British Isles between 1660 and 1911.

== Academic career ==
After receiving his MA, Woollard worked as a Research Assistant on a project supporting the development of an English version of Kleio, a database analysis system for historians. He then worked as a Research Associate on the Bristol Historical Databases project at the University of the West of England from 1993 until joining the University of Essex History Department as a Research Officer in 1996.

At Essex, he helped develop a database of nineteenth-century census data that fed into the North Atlantic Population Project. In 2003, he joined the UK Data Archive as Head of Service for the History Data Service (AHDS History), which formed part of the Arts and Humanities Data Service. He became associate director and Head of Digital Preservation and Systems at the UK Data Archive in 2006.

In 2010, he became Director of the UK Data Archive and the Economic and Social Data Service (ESDS), which was later expanded into the UK Data Service in October 2012. Woollard was appointed as the first Director of the UK Data Service, holding this position until 2023.

As UK Data Service Director, he played a key role in establishing the Consortium of European Social Science Data Archives (CESSDA), acting as Vice Chair of the CESSDA Board of Directors from 2013 to 2015. He also served as a UK representative on the OECD Expert Group for legal issues relating to new forms of data, as well as the European Strategy Forum on Research Infrastructures, and was editor of the journal History and Computing.

== Honours and awards ==
Woollard was awarded an OBE in the King’s Birthday Honours List 2024 for services to data science. He has also been awarded a Data Champions Award for his efforts in advancing data, accessibility and promoting responsible data practices.

== Selected bibliography ==
- Corti, L., Van den Eynden, V., Bishop, L and Woollard, M. (2019) Managing and Sharing Data: A Guide to Good Practice (2nd edition), London: Sage Publications.
- Corti, L., Van den Eynden, V., Bishop, L and Woollard, M. (2014) Managing and Sharing Data: A Guide to Good Practice, London: Sage Publications.
- Beagrie, N., Lavoie, B., & Woollard, M. (2010). Keeping Research Data Safe 2: Final Report. Joint Information Systems Committee (JISC). http://www.jisc.ac.uk/media/documents/publications/reports/2010/keepingresearchdatasafe2.pdf
- Grover, C., Tobin, R., Byrne, K., Woollard, M., Reid, J., Dunn, S., & Ball, J. (2010). Use of the Edinburgh geo-parser for geo-referencing digitized historical collections. Philosophical Transactions of the Royal Society A: Mathematical, Physical and Engineering Sciences, 368(1925), 3875–3889. http://dx.doi.org/10.1098/rsta.2010.0149
