= ESDS Qualidata =

ESDS Qualidata is a specialist service of the Economic and Social Data Service (ESDS), led by the UK Data Archive at the University of Essex, jointly funded by the Joint Information Systems Committee (JISC) and the Economic and Social Research Council (ESRC). The service provides access to a wide range of qualitative data from the social sciences as well as user-support, promoting the increased use of secondary analysis in social research and related learning and teaching resources.

In July 2012, the ESRC announced it will become a partner in the UK Data Service, to be established as of October 1, 2012.

== Data ==
The data acquired by ESDS Qualidata are part of contemporary qualitative research across a wide range of social science disciplines and are derived from a varied spectrum of methodological approaches, such as: in-depth, semi-structured and structured interviews, focus groups, fieldnotes, observations, personal documents, photographs and audio. The majority of acquired data can be searched and downloaded through an online catalogue.

The selection of data considers each study's relative importance, the particular format, the degree of usability and condition of the materials on offer, the re-use potential and issues of copyright and confidentiality.

The service also provides access to some of the classic studies of British society including:

- Family Life of Old People (1955), The Last Refuge (1959) and Poverty in the UK (1979) by Peter Townsend
- The Edwardians (1975) by Paul Thompson
- Stanley Cohen's Folk Devils and Moral Panics (1967)
- The Affluent Worker (1962) by John H. Goldthorpe et al.

Access to the data is reliant upon the UK Access Management Federation for Education and Research (supported by the Shibboleth (Internet2) software) and is free of charge.
