= Economic and Social Data Service =

British national data archiving service

- Abbreviation: ESDS
- Formation: 2003
- Legal status: Government-funded data service
- Location: UK Data Archive, University of Essex
- Region served: UK
- Director: Matthew Woollard
- Affiliations: ESRC, JISC, University of Essex
- Website: ESDS

The Economic and Social Data Service (ESDS) is a national data archiving and dissemination service that was founded in January 2003. It is funded jointly by the Economic and Social Research Council (ESRC) and Jisc. In July 2012, the ESRC announced it will become a partner in the UK Data Service, to be established as of October 1st of 2012.

== Scope of work ==
ESDS provides access to and support for a wide range of key economic and social data in the UK. The collection covers both quantitative and qualitative data which span many different disciplines and themes.

== Structure ==
ESDS service is a distributed service, based on collaboration between four key centres of expertise: UK Data Archive, Institute for Social and Economic Research (ISER), both based at the University of Essex; Manchester Information and Associated Services (Mimas) and Cathie Marsh Centre for Census and Survey Research (CCSR), both located at the University of Manchester.

These centres work in collaboration to acquire, process, preserve and disseminate a wide range of data across the social sciences. ESDS also provides enhanced user support and training for the secondary use of data for the research, learning and teaching communities.

== Data services ==
The UK Data Archive is responsible for the overall direction and management of the ESDS. Within ESDS, four specialist data services provide value-added support as follows:

- ESDS Government promotes and facilitates the use of large-scale government surveys, such as the Labour Force Survey and Health Survey for England in research, learning, and teaching.
- ESDS International provides access to, and support for, international (typically comparative) datasets from both survey and aggregate sources.
- ESDS Longitudinal supports a range of the key UK longitudinal data.
- ESDS Qualidata provides access to, and support for, qualitative datasets, from classic studies from the 1960s and 1970s to contemporary data.

Study descriptions and online documentation, including questionnaires, of datasets can be accessed online free of charge and without registering. Access to data requires registration and uses federated access management (shibboleth) user authentication. Registered users can also download and explore/analyse online a large and growing number of datasets.
