= Luisa Passerini =

Italian cultural historian

Luisa Passerini (born 1941) is an Italian cultural historian. Formerly Professor of Cultural History at the University of Turin, she is an external Professor of History at the European University Institute, Florence, and visiting professor in the Oral History Masters Program at Columbia University, New York.

== Life ==
Luisa Passerini was born in 1941 and educated at the University of Turin, graduating in philosophy and history in 1965. She was politically active as a student, and in 1967 she spent time in Dar es Salaam, studying and working with the Mozambican liberation movement Frelimo.

In the late 1970s, Passerini moved away from social and political history to cultural history. Torino operaia e Fascismo (1984) used oral history to explore the self-representation of working-class men and women in the Fascist period. Autoritratto di gruppo (1988) combined oral history with novelistic treatment of a young woman's student experience in the late 1960s, with alternating chapters in diary form.

In summer 1989 Passerini was visiting professor of history at the New School for Social Research in New York. In fall 1993 she was visiting professor at New York University.

== Works ==
- Fascism in popular memory : the cultural experience of the Turin working class. Cambridge: Cambridge University Press, 1986. Translated by Robert Lumley and Jude Bloomfield from the Italian Torino operaia e fascismo [Turin workers and fascism], 1984.
- (ed.) Memory and totalitarianism. Oxford; New York: Oxford University Press, 1992.
- Autobiography of a Generation: Italy 1968. Hanover; London: Wesleyan University Press, 1996. Translated from the Italian Autoritratto di gruppo [Autobiography of a group], Florence: Giunti, 1988.
- (ed. with Selma Leydesdorff and Paul Thompson) Gender and memory. Oxford; New York: Oxford University Press, 1996.
- Europe in love, love in Europe: imagination and politics between the wars. London : I.B. Tauris, 1999.
- Memory and utopia: the primacy of intersubjectivity. London: Equinox, 2005.
- (ed. 2010) Women migrants from East to West: gender, mobility and belonging in contemporary Europe. New York: Berghahn Books, 2010.
- (ed. with Liliana Ellena and Alexander C.T. Geppert) New dangerous liaisons: discourses on Europe and love in the twentieth century. New York: Berghahn Books, 2010.
- (ed. with Jo Labanyi and Karen Diehl) Europe and love in cinema. Bristol & Chicago: Intellect, 2012.
- (ed. with) Dissonant heritages and memories in contemporary Europe. Cham: Palgrave Macmillan, 2019.
