= FACS =

FACS or FaCS may refer to

== Organizations ==
- Department of Family and Community Services (Australia)
- Department of Family and Community Services (New South Wales), Australia
- Family and Community Services (South Australia), Australia
- First Assembly Christian School, in Memphis, Tennessee, US
- BCS-FACS, a British Computer Society Specialist Group for Formal Aspects of Computing Science

== Science and technology ==
- Fluorescence-activated cell sorting, applied in flow cytometry
- Facial Action Coding System, to systematically describe human facial expressions
- Families and Children Study, a longitudinal study in Great Britain

== Other uses ==
- Fellow of the Australian Computer Society
- Fellow of the American College of Surgeons
- Family and consumer science, or home economics
- FA Community Shield
