= Oral History Society =

Founded	1973
Publication	Oral History
Homepage	ohs.org.uk

The Oral History Society promotes the collection, preservation and use of recorded memories of the past.

As well as offering practical advice and support, the Society aims to raise standards in oral history practices across a range of activities and disciplines.

Through an annual conference, other meetings, a web site and the Oral History journal the Society encourages individuals to share ideas, experience and good practice.

The Society also provides a voice for oral historians advising and collaborating with national organisations and research councils on oral history

== Origins and history ==
The British-based organisation was founded in 1973, with its origins in an informal day conference at the British Institute of Recorded Sound (BIRS) in 1969. In the early years support for the Society was drawn from amongst labour and social historians as well as archivists, folklorists, ethnographers and researchers in oral tradition (including the School of Scottish Studies). By the second half of the 1970s the Society also included feminist historians and others interested in women's history. The Oral History journal, founded by Paul Thompson, has echoed these interests and many more in the articles it has published. Often featuring oral histories of individuals or groups who have been under-represented in historical accounts, from the first edition Oral History has also provided a forum for oral historians to discuss the methods and challenges involved in the collection, interpretation and dissemination of oral testimonies.

The journal has long maintained a news section that includes reports from community projects as well as a reviews section. This reflects the Society's policy of representing oral historians no matter where they work whether it is in education, community organisations or the media.

== Current activities ==
Current activities include providing more than 300 training places each year; supporting over 40 experienced oral historians as locally based Regional Networkers - a point of contact for anyone interested in oral history; offering technical, legal and ethical advice; providing information on the funding of oral history work; and publishing two editions of Oral History each year. Members also receive a free e-newsletter several times a year with briefings and news items.

== Governance and structures ==
A Committee of Trustees meets four times a year. Trustees are responsible for the governance of the Society and are elected at the Society's Annual General Meeting which is held at the Society's annual conference. Officers' positions of the Society include a Chair, Vice-Chair, Secretary and Treasurer who are also elected annually.

A key structure of the Society is the Regional Network consisting of oral historians who offer a first point of contact in localities throughout Britain and Northern Ireland. The Trustees' sub-committees reflect the priority areas and include a Nominations Committee, Higher Education Group, Trainers Group and an Archives Sub-Committee. The journal has its own Editorial Committee.

== See also ==
- Historiography of the United Kingdom

== Legacy ==
The Oral History Society Archive is housed at the British Library. The papers can be accessed through the British Library catalogue.
