= Conrad Penny =

South African businessman, born 1951

Conrad Penny / Roddy Penny
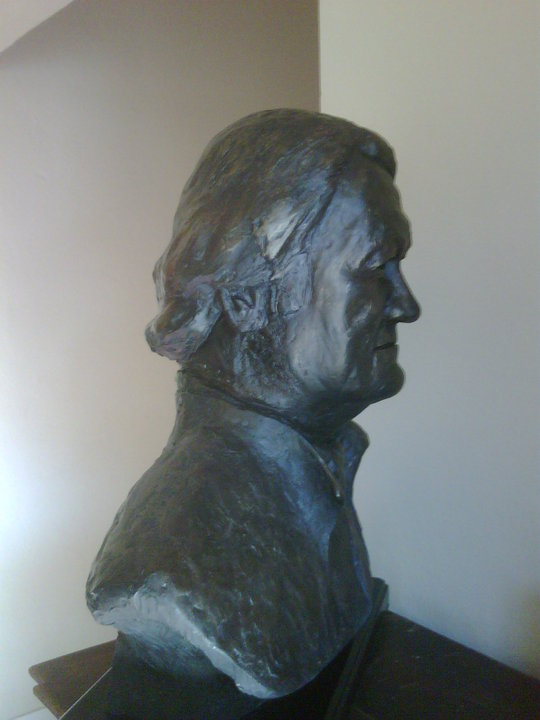
- Born: Conrad Hugo Penny; 31 May 1951 (age 74); Durban, South Africa
- Occupations: Property broker and valuer, researcher, analyst
- Known for: Evaluating the whole of Soweto

Conrad Hugo Penny (born 31 May 1951) is a South African property broker and property valuer who has worked for Penny Brothers Brokers & Valuers for over fifty years. He is the founder and chair of Penny Holdings (Pty) Ltd. and the Managing Director of Penny Brothers Brokers & Valuers (Pty) Ltd. He is also an appraiser to the South African Minister of Justice.

== Family and early life ==
Conrad Penny was born on 31 May 1951 in Durban, South Africa, the son of Errol Penny and Nina Hartdegen, Grandson of Magnus Penny (a descendant of the Penny's of Marchwood, whose earlier forebears are believed to stem from Thomas Penne, a substantial landowner in the area from the 1100s) and Elizabeth le Sueur, Great-Grandson of Herbert Penny (founder of the Royal Naval Volunteer Reserve in the Cape which ultimately led to the formation of the South African Navy) and Carlotta Forssman (daughter of Chevalier Oscar Wilhelm Alric Forssman of Sweden who was the son of Jonas Samuel Forssman (1783 and 1835), Councillor of the War Cabinet of Sweden.

Penny's mother was a granddaughter of Cuninghame Wilson Moore, the older brother of Sir Archibald Gordon Moore, KCB, CVO, Third Sea Lord. In March 2015 Penny attended the reinterment of King Richard III of England as a guest of Leicester University and Leicester Cathedral. In addition to Penny's royal ancestry, Kevin Schürer identified and recognised Penny as a descendant of at least ten other Lords, Knights and soldiers at the 1485 Battle of Bosworth where Richard III lost his life.

Penny was educated at St Stithians College (1964–65) and Hyde Park High School (1966–68) in Johannesburg. Penny was privately educated "in house" at Penny Brothers between 1970 and 1973 where Town Planner Professor EWN Mallows, Quantity Surveyor and Civil Engineer ACM Tyrrell, Company/Property Lawyer PJP Neall and Company/Tax Account AE Hirsowitz were put at his disposal for his tertiary education. He later passed the valuer's exam set by The South African Council for the Property Valuers Profession. Penny married Baroness Maria-Therésia Kotz von Dobrz in Austria on 7 January 1978 and together they have two sons and two daughters.

== Career ==
In 1996 Penny's company, Penny Brothers Brokers & Valuers (Pty) Ltd., was awarded tenders for the valuation of the whole of Soweto, in Johannesburg, which valuation included over 325 000 dwellings. The tenders were awarded by the City of Johannesburg Metropolitan Municipality for taxing and rating purposes. This was the single largest valuation ever undertaken in Africa.

Penny is a member of the Institute of Estate Agents of South Africa, a member of the South African Institute of Valuers, appraiser to the Hon. South African Minister of Justice and is registered as a professional valuer with the South African Council for the Property Valuers. Given his interest in anthropology and paleontology, he is also a member of the Royal Society of South Africa.

Penny is the owner of Chartwell Castle in north western Johannesburg, where he laid out the largest permanent hedgerow Maze in the Southern Hemisphere.

== Philanthropy and civic work ==
Trees - Penny has also propagated approximately 7000 trees at Chartwell Castle which have been donated to the streets, pavements, parks, schools and Places of Worship and Refuge mainly within the City of Johannesburg Metropolitan Municipality.

Chartwell Local Area Committee - In around 1988, Penny as Chairman of the Farmall and Farmall Ext. 1 Landowners Association, assisted in the creation of The Greater Chartwell Local Area Committee, in what was then the outlying regions of northern Johannesburg. The merger of the surrounding areas resulted in a rate based income being viable to afford the region with tarred roads along arterial routes and the provision of municipal water supply. Consequently, the sub-division of land became possible and the region has since been incorporated into the City of Johannesburg Metropolitan Municipality.

Rand Club - In 2016, Conrad Penny initiated the formation of the Rand Club Salvage Consortium (RCSC) which successfully resuscitated the historic (1887) Rand Club of Johannesburg (and its fine Edwardian building) after it had been mothballed because of a decline in membership following a general exodus from the old CBD of Johannesburg.
