= Kevin Schürer =

British academic (born 1957)

Kevin Schürer FAcSS FRGS
- Born: 22 June 1957 (age 69); Rochford, Essex, England
- Other name: Kevin Schurer
- Education: University of London
- Occupations: Historian, genealogist, statistician, academic
- Employer: University of Leicester
- Known for: identification of King Richard III

Kevin Schürer FAcSS FRGS (born 22 June 1957) is a British historian, genealogist and statistician, previously Pro-Vice Chancellor of Research and Enterprise, who teaches at the University of Leicester. He specialises in the historical demography, the history of the family and migration in nineteenth-century England and Wales.

== Education and career ==
Schürer studied geography and history as an undergraduate before receiving his PhD from the University of London. He is a member of the Cambridge Group for the History of Population and Social Structure at the University of Cambridge, and then taught at the University of Essex, where he is now an honorary professor.

Schürer was the UK representative, on behalf of the Economic and Social Research Council (ESRC) and Arts and Humanities Research Council, at the European Strategy Forum for Research Infrastructure (ESFRI) working group in Social Science and Humanities.

In 2009, he received a grant from the ESRC to create standardised version of the censuses for Great Britain for 1851 to 1911. Known as the Integrated Census Microdata (I-CeM) project, the result was one of the largest digital historical data resources in the world.

He served as president of the Consortium of European Social Science Data Archives. Prior to joining the University of Leicester, he served as the director of the UK Data Archive from 2000 to 2010. He is currently a senior member of Wolfson College, Cambridge, and is chair of the British Library's EThOS advisory committee, having previously served as a member of the British Library's Advisory Council and the Research Libraries Network Advisory Committee.

== Richard III research ==
Schürer is most well known for his genealogical research to find descendants of the immediate relatives of King Richard III, whose remains were found in a Leicester carpark in 2012. Schürer's research was instrumental in identifying the remains as that of the king, who was killed in 1485 at the Battle of Bosworth Field.

Among the royal descendants Schürer discovered is English actor Benedict Cumberbatch, who read a poem at Richard III's reburial on 26 March 2015, and Conrad Penny, whose ancestor William Stanley led the charge that ended with Richard III being hacked to death in 1485. Penny is also descended from Richard's brother George, Duke of Clarence on the Plantagenet side.

Prior to Richard III's reburial, the descendants of at least 20 families who fought at the Battle of Bosworth, as traced by Schürer, met together and visited the battlefield. Some of them traveled from Australia, Canada and South Africa. Their ancestors include Sir John Babington of Dethick, Derbyshire, sheriff of Derby and Nottingham and is reported to have fought for Richard's side; Sir Reginald Bray from Worcester, who is believed to have discovered the king's crown on a hawthorn bush on the battlefield; Marmaduke Constable, who survived multiple battles only to die after choking on a frog while drinking water; Simon Digby, who was subsequently knighted and given the manor of Coleshill, Warwickshire for his part in the battle; Samuel Spriggs from Leicestershire, believed to be the Esquire of the Body; John Hardwick, who advised Henry Tudor on the best battle positions based on his knowledge of the terrain and thus credited as "the architect of Richard's defeat;" Thomas Iden who fought for the House of Lancaster and later served as the Sheriff of Kent in 1500.

In 2014, Schürer and the other researchers—dubbed "The Grey Friars Research Team"—published a book about the discovery, exhumation and identification of Richard III, The Bones of a King: Richard III Rediscovered.

== Awards ==
Schürer won the 2011 Warren E. Miller Award for Meritorious Service to the Social Sciences, presented by the ICPSR.

== Select publications ==
- The Grey Friars Research Team (2015). The Bones of a King: Richard III Rediscovered. Leicester: Wiley-Blackwell. ISBN 978-1-118-78314-6.
- Schürer, Kevin (2001). Better Access To Electronic Information For The Citizen. Luxembourg: Publications Office of the European Union.
- Schürer, Kevin (2001). Changing Family Size In England And Wales. Place, Class and Demography, 1891-1911.
- Schürer, Kevin (1998). The Irish Data Archive Feasibility Project. Dublin: University of Essex.
- Schürer, Kevin; Mills, Dennis R. (1996). Victorian Communities In Census Enumerator's Books. Oxford: Leopard's Head Press.
- Schürer, Kevin; Diederiks, Herman (1993). The Use of Occupations in Historical Analysis. St. Katharinen: Max Planck Society.
- Schürer, Kevin; Arkell, Tom (1992). Surveying The People. Oxford: Oxford University Press.
- Schürer, Kevin (1992). A Guide to Historical Data Files in Machine-Readable Form.

Civic offices
Preceded by Denise Lievesley	Director of the ESRC Data Archive; 2000–2010	Succeeded by Matthew Woollard
