= Paul Thompson (oral historian) =

British sociologist and oral historian (born 1935)

Paul Thompson in 1997

Paul Thompson (born 1935) is a British sociologist and oral historian. Prior to his retirement, he held the position of research professor of sociology at the University of Essex. Thompson is regarded as a pioneer in social science research, particularly due to the development of life stories and oral history within sociology and social history.

== Academic career ==
Thompson was educated at the University of Oxford, graduating in 1958 with First Class Honours in modern history. He obtained a D.Phil. (also at the University of Oxford) in 1964. This was entitled London Working Class Politics and the Formation of the London Labour Party, 1885-1914. In 1964, having spent three years as a Junior Research Fellow at Queen's College, Oxford, Thompson was appointed Lecturer in Sociology (Social History) at the newly established University of Essex. He was to continue his research and teaching in sociology and social history at Essex, being appointed research professor in sociology, in 1988.

Between 1994 and 2001, Thompson was also the Director of ESDS Qualidata, University of Essex, where he actively pursued his interest in the preservation of qualitative research materials for secondary use. In doing so, he deposited most his own datasets there while at the same time he was actively involved in the development of this archival service.

== Oral History ==
Thompson is regarded as one of the pioneers of oral history as a research methodology in the social sciences. In 1973 he founded the Oral History Society and the journal Oral History. Between 1970 and 1973 he carried out a project titled 'Family Life and Work Experience before 1918' which was the first national oral history interview study to be carried out in Britain. The project resulted in a number of publications, including Thompson's The Edwardians: The Remaking of British Society, which was published in 1975 and again in revised form in 1992.

In 1987 he also founded the National Life Story Collection (now known as National Life Stories) at the British Library National Sound Archive in London. The aim of this new collection was to "record first-hand experiences of as wide a cross-section of present-day society as possible".

Subsequent oral history work includes studies of the family and community life of Scottish fishermen as well as car workers in Coventry and Turin. Thompson carried out a research project aimed at recording life stories with trans-national Jamaican families and expanded on his work with pioneers of social research.

== Selected publications ==
- Architecture: art or social service, London: Fabian Society, 1963
- With Kidson, P. and Murray, P. A history of English architecture, Harmondsworth: Penguin Books, 1965
- Socialists, Liberals and Labour: the struggle for London 1885-1914, London: Routledge, Kegan Paul and University of Toronto Press, 1967
- The work of William Morris, New York: William Heinemann and Viking Press, 1967
- William Butterfield, Routledge & Kegan Paul, London, 1971, ISBN 0-7100-6930-8
- The Edwardians: the remaking of British society, London: Weidenfeld and Nicolson, 1975
- The voice of the past: oral history, Oxford: Oxford University Press, 1978
- With Burchardt, N. (eds.) Our common history: the transformation of Europe, London: Pluto Press, 1982
- Living the fishing, London, Boston: Routledge and Kegan Paul, 1983
- With Itzin, C. and Abendstern, M. I don't feel old: the experience of later life, Oxford: Oxford University Press, 1990
- With Samuel, R. (eds.) The myths we live by, London: Routledge, 1990
- With et al. Listening for a change: oral testimony and development, London: Panos Publications, 1993
- With Bertaux, D. (eds.) Between generations: family models, myths and memories, Oxford: Oxford University Press, 1993
- With Passerini, L. and Leydesdorff, S. (eds.) Gender and memory, Oxford: Oxford University, 1996
- With Bertaux, D. Pathways to social class: a qualitative approach to social mobility, Oxford: Clarendon Press, 1996
- With Courtney, C. City lives: the changing voices of British finance, London: Methuen, 1996
- With et al. Growing up in stepfamilies, USA: Oxford University Press, 1997
- With Chamberlain, M. (eds.) Narrative and genre: contexts and types of communication, London: Routledge, 1998
- With Hussey, S. (eds.) Environmental consciousness: the roots of a new political agenda, New York: Transaction, 2004
- With Bertaux, D. and Rotkirch, A. (eds.) On living through Soviet Russia, London: Routledge, 2004
- With Bauer, E. Jamaican hands across the Atlantic, Kingston, Jamaica: Ian Randle, 2006
- With Corti, B. Sea-change: Wivenhoe remembered, Stoud: Tempus, 2006
