= AHDS Archaeology =

AHDS Archaeology was one of the subject centres of the Arts and Humanities Data Service, which closed in March 2008. Its role was to support digital research in the arts and humanities in the UK. AHDS Archaeology was hosted by the Archaeology Data Service at the University of York, which continues to be funded directly by the Arts and Humanities Research Council.
