= ESDS Government =

ESDS Government is a national data service which provides large-scale government surveys, such as the General Household Survey and the Labour Force Survey, as well as other key data resources for understanding population structure and change in the UK and its constituent countries. It is jointly funded by the Economic and Social Research Council (ESRC) and the Joint Information Systems Committee (JISC).

In July 2012, the ESRC announced that all of ESDS will join the UK Data Service, to be established as of October 1, 2012.

== Service overview ==
Some examples of the research supported by the surveys include:

- resources, health and living conditions of older people
- ethnic differences in family and household composition
- patterns of consumption, including drinking and smoking
- gender and ethnic differences in employment earnings
- lifestyle, consumption and health patterns
- social capital and its relationship to health, employment and earnings
- comparisons across different UK regions and across different time periods

ESDS Government is led by the Cathie Marsh Centre for Census and Survey Research (CCSR) and provides user support, facilitates user meetings on specific surveys, organises training courses on topics of interest, on specific statistical software packages and on statistical analysis methods as well as provides topic-related online course materials and a range of teaching datasets.

One of the central aims of the service is to promote and facilitate increased and more effective use of government datasets in research, learning and teaching across a range of disciplines.

The acquisition, processing and delivery of the large-scale government datasets under this service is undertaken by the UK Data Archive. Data is available both via download and online exploration and visualisation via Nesstar.
