= Preference theory =

Sociological theory

Preference theory is a multidisciplinary (mainly sociological) theory developed by Catherine Hakim. It seeks both to explain and predict women's choices regarding investment in productive or reproductive work.

== Description ==
The theory sets out five socio-economic conditions which jointly create a new scenario:

1. The contraceptive revolution gives women reliable control over their own fertility for the first time in history.
2. The equal opportunities revolution gives women genuine access to all positions and occupations for the first time in history
3. The expansion of white-collar occupations, which may be more attractive to women than men.
4. The creation of jobs for secondary earners, such as part-time jobs, remote workers, and annual hours contracts.
5. The increasing importance of attitudes and values in affluent modern societies, which gives everyone the freedom to choose their lifestyle.

Preference theory posits that in the rare countries that have fully achieved the new scenario for women (she cites only Britain and the Netherlands), women have genuine choices as to how they resolve the conflict between paid jobs and a major investment in family life. These choices fall into three main groups: women who prioritise their careers and espouse achievement values (a work-centred lifestyle) and often remain childless by choice (about 20%); women who prioritise family life and sharing values (a home-centred lifestyle) and often have many children and little paid work (about 20%); and the majority of women who seek to combine paid jobs and family work in some way without giving absolute priority to either activity or the accompanying values (the adaptive lifestyle).

== Studies ==
Catherine Hakim carried out two national surveys, in Britain and Spain, to test the theory, and showed that questions eliciting personal preferences can strongly predict women's employment decisions and fertility. In contrast, women's behaviour did not predict their attitudes, showing that lifestyle preferences are not post hoc rationalisations.

This study also showed that other sex-role attitudes do not have the same impact on women's behaviour; notably, the patriarchal values measured by most social surveys, including the European Social Survey, have virtually no impact on women's personal choices and behaviour.

== Criticism ==
Hakim's preference theory has attracted great interest in the literature, but also considerable criticism. The main criticism is that it does not demonstrate causality, that the observed preferences causes changes in fertility patterns, and that it has been suggested that actual fertility may change values and preferences. It has also been suggested that the observed effect of lifestyle preferences on achieved fertility may absorbed by other factors when controlled for. A follow-up study "found that Hakim’s typology does not work well in the Czech Republic", that there were no important differences in fertility between the three groups in that country. A second follow-up study, surveying eleven European countries, found support for the theory in only two countries (Britain and Denmark).

== See also ==
- Liquidity preference
- Revealed preference
- Time preference
