= Catherine Hakim =

British sociologist (born 1948)

- كاترين حكيم
- Born: 30 May 1948 (age 78); Beirut, Lebanon

Academic background
- Education: University of Sussex (BA); University of Essex (PhD)

Academic work
- Discipline: Sociology
- Sub-discipline: Preference theory, erotic capital
- Institutions: Institute for the Study of Civil Society, Centre for Policy Studies, London School of Economics (1993–2011), ESRC Data Archive, Department of Employment

Catherine Hakim (born 30 May 1948) (Arabic: كاترين حكيم) is a British sociologist who specialises in women's employment and women's issues. She is known for developing the preference theory, for her work on erotic capital and more recently for a sex-deficit theory. She is currently a professorial research fellow at the Institute for the Study of Civil Society (Civitas), and has formerly worked in British central government and been a senior research fellow at the London School of Economics and the Centre for Policy Studies. She has also been a visiting professor at the Social Science Research Center Berlin.

== Background ==
Born in Beirut, Hakim grew up in the Middle East and moved to the United Kingdom for boarding school at age 16, around 1964. She earned a B.A. at the University of Sussex in 1969 and a Ph.D. in sociology at the University of Essex in 1974. She worked in Caracas, Venezuela 1969–1972 and as a research officer with the Tavistock Institute in London 1972–1974. She was a senior research officer with the British Office of Population Censuses and Surveys (now the Office for National Statistics) 1974–1978, and a principal research officer with the Department of Employment 1978–1989. She was professor of sociology at the University of Essex and director of the ESRC Data Archive 1989–1990. She was affiliated with the London School of Economics between 1993 and 2011; she became a Morris Ginsberg fellow in 1993 and was employed as a senior research fellow in the sociology department until 2003. From 2003 to 2011 she was affiliated with the LSE in a visiting capacity; she maintained an office at the institution and was listed as a senior research fellow in the sociology department at the LSE website until 2011, when the arrangement came to an end amid public discussion of her book Honey Money. Since 2011 she has been a professorial research fellow at the Centre for Policy Studies and the Institute for the Study of Civil Society (Civitas), and a visiting professor at the Social Science Research Center Berlin.

== Career and work ==
Hakim has published extensively on labour market topics, women's employment, sex discrimination, social and family policy, as well as social statistics and research design. She has published over 100 articles in academic journals and edited collections, as well as over a dozen textbooks and research monographs. She is best known for developing preference theory and for her criticism of many feminist assumptions about women's employment. Her most recent books develop a theory of "erotic capital" and its power in all social interaction, in the workplace, politics and in public life generally as well as in the invisible negotiations of private relationships.

Hakim was a member of the editorial board of the European Sociological Review and a former member of the editorial board of International Sociology.

=== The idea of erotic capital ===
==== Catherine Hakim's perspective ====
Hakim states that erotic capital is an asset in many social and economic settings such as media and politics. This theory added erotic as an additional form of capital to Pierre Bourdieu's concept of society being run by four main types of capital – cultural, social, symbolic, and economic. Hakim defined erotic capital as the concept that an individual's beauty, sexual attractiveness, enhanced social interaction, liveliness, social presentation, sexuality, and fertility can provide opportunities to advance in life. According to Hakim, the most important and controversial of these seven components would be sexual attractiveness, as her studies indicated that family men tend to crave sex more than women, a phenomenon she named the male sex deficit. She encouraged young women to use this asset to earn a more respectable position in society. Hakim believes that erotic capital has gone unacknowledged for far too long and that the patriarchal society and moral constraints of conservative communities have caused the idea of beauty and attractiveness to stress the importance of personality, not giving enough credit to physique. She does not encourage a society based on solely erotic capital but rather states that it plays a subconscious role in daily life decisions, such as career offerings, enrichment opportunities, and social networking. For example, she places current dating apps and social media on the spotlight, stating that the internet has created somewhat of a digitized version of dating and that these markets will gain traction as time goes on. She strongly believes that these sites and the decision to marry are driven by a woman's erotic capital and a man's economic capital.

==== Contradictions ====
Many groups such as feminists have actively rejected the idea of erotic capital by stating that the sex positive movement highlights the rights of women in only a manner that highlights advantages and ignores contradictory research that has shown that attractive women are less likely to receive a promotion. Bourdieu's followers have asserted that he had developed the idea of 'body capital' long ago but refused to include it in his general capital because it was too intertwined with economic capital. For example, if a woman from a high socioeconomic status could buy beauty products and afford body shaping surgeries, she would be able to change her body capital.

== Sex deficit ==
In 2017, Hakim was accused of misogyny after publishing an article which critics claim suggested women are to blame for sexual assault. The article bases its argument on a research paper published in 2015 which evaluated 30 sex surveys globally and claimed that, in the years since the 1960s sexual revolution, women's growing financial independence—enabled partly by contraception—has reduced their sexual motivation and availability, widening the 'male sexual deficit' in the developed world. This, it is argued, can help explain why sexual harassment, sexual violence, rape, rising demand for commercial sexual services and other behaviours are almost exclusively male. She has argued that the sex deficit also derives from men naturally having a higher sex drive than women.

== Publications ==
=== Selected books ===
- Secondary analysis in social research, London : Allen & Unwin, 1982, ISBN 0-04-312015-6, ISBN 0-04-312016-4
- Social Change and Innovation in the Labour Market: Evidence from the Census SARs on Occupational Segregation and Labour Mobility, Part-Time Work and Student Jobs, Homework and Self-Employment (Oxford University Press, 1998). ISBN 0-19-829381-X
- Work-Lifestyle Choices in the 21st Century: Preference Theory (Oxford University Press, 2000). With a Preface by Anthony Giddens. ISBN 0-19-924210-0
- Research Design: Successful Designs for Social and Economic Research (Routledge, 2000). ISBN 978-0-415-22312-6
- Models of the Family in Modern Societies: Ideals and Realities (Ashgate, 2003). ISBN 0-7546-4406-5
- Key Issues in Women's Work (Glasshouse Press, 1996, 2004). ISBN 1-904385-16-8
- Modelos de Familia en las Sociedades Modernas: Ideales y Realidades (Centro de Investigaciones Sociológicas, 2005). ISBN 978-84-7476-378-2
- Little Britons: Financing Childcare Choice (Policy Exchange, 2008), with Karen Bradley, Emily Price and Louisa Mitchell. ISBN 978-1-906097-21-9
- Honey money: why attractiveness is the key to success. London: Penguin. 2012. ISBN 9780241952214.

=== Selected articles ===
- Hakim, Catherine (March 1998). "Developing a sociology for the twenty-first century: Preference Theory". British Journal of Sociology. 49 (1): 137–143. doi:10.2307/591267. JSTOR 591267.
- Hakim, Catherine (2004). "A new approach to explaining fertility patterns: Preference Theory". Population and Development Review. 29 (3): 349–374. doi:10.1111/j.1728-4457.2003.00349.x. Archived from the original on 6 March 2012.
- Hakim, Catherine (August 2006). "Women, careers, and work-life preferences". British Journal of Guidance and Counselling. 34 (3): 279–294. doi:10.1080/03069880600769118. S2CID 13388770. Pdf.
- Hakim, Catherine (September 2003). "Public morality versus personal choice: the failure of social attitude surveys". British Journal of Sociology. 54 (3): 339–345. doi:10.1111/j.1468-4446.2003.00339.x. PMID 14514462.
- Hakim, Catherine (November 2002). "Lifestyle preferences as determinants of women's differentiated labor market careers". Work and Occupations. 29 (4): 428–459. doi:10.1177/0730888402029004003. S2CID 153914313.
- Hakim, Catherine (2007). "The politics of female diversity in the 21st century". In Browne, Jude (ed.). The future of gender. Cambridge, UK New York: Cambridge University Press. pp. 191–227. ISBN 9780511619205.
- Hakim, Catherine (2005). "Sex differences in work-life balance goals". In Houston, Diane (ed.). Work-life balance in the 21st century. Houndmills, Basingstoke, Hampshire New York: Palgrave Macmillan. pp. 55–79. ISBN 9781403920621.
- Hakim, Catherine (2004). "Lifestyle preferences versus patriarchal values: causal and non-causal attitudes". In Zollinger Giele, Janet; Holst, Elke (eds.). Changing life patterns in Western industrial societies. Amsterdam Boston: Elsevier/JAI. pp. 69–91. ISBN 9780762310203.
- Hakim, Catherine (October 2010). "Erotic capital". European Sociological Review. 26 (5): 499–518. doi:10.1093/esr/jcq014.
- Hakim, Catherine (2011). "Women's lifestyle preferences in the 21st century: Implications for family policy". In Beets, Gijs; Schippers, Joop; te Velde, Egbert R. (eds.). The future of motherhood in western societies: late fertility and its consequences. Dordrecht, Netherlands New York: Springer. pp. 177–196. ISBN 9789048189694.

Civic offices
| Preceded by Howard Newby | Director of the ESRC Data Archive; 1989–1990 | Succeeded by Denise Lievesley |
