= Denise Lievesley =

British social statistician

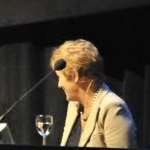
Lievesley in 2009

Denise Anne Lievesley CBE, FAcSS is a British social statistician. She has formerly been Chief Executive of the English Information Centre for Health and Social Care, Director of Statistics at UNESCO, in which capacity she founded the UNESCO Institute for Statistics, and Director (1991–1997) of what is now the UK Data Archive (known as the ESRC Data Archive and as the Data Archive during her tenure).

Lievesley studied undergraduate statistics at UCL, gaining a BSc in 1971.

While Director of the Data Archive, Lievesley held the position of Professor of Research Methods at the University of Essex. She has served as a United Nations Special Adviser on Statistics, stationed in Addis Ababa.

Lievesley served as president of the Royal Statistical Society from 1999 to 2001, and has been President of the International Statistical Institute (2007–2009) and the International Association for Official Statistics (1995–1997). She is an Honorary Fellow of St Edmund's College, Cambridge. She was appointed Commander of the Order of the British Empire (CBE) in the 2014 Birthday Honours for services to social science. And she is currently president of the Archive of Market and Social Research. In 2026 she was awarded honorary fellowship of the Market Research Society.

Until 2015, Lievesley was Executive Dean of the Faculty of Social Science and Public Policy and Professor of Social Statistics at King's College London, where she remains an honorary professor. From 2015 to 2020 she was Principal of Green Templeton College, Oxford, where she remains an honorary fellow. She is currently a lay member of the Council of Durham University.

In June 2023, it was announced she would lead a review of the UK Statistics Authority as part of the regular cycle of reviews of UK public bodies. Her review recommended a triennial user assembly to gauge priorities across the statistical system, the first of which was held in January 2025.

Civic offices
Preceded by Catherine Hakim	Director of the ESRC Data Archive; 1991–1997	Succeeded by Kevin Schürer
Academic offices
Preceded by David Watson	Principal of Green Templeton College, Oxford; 2015 to 2020	Succeeded by Michael Dixon
