= Herbert Penny =

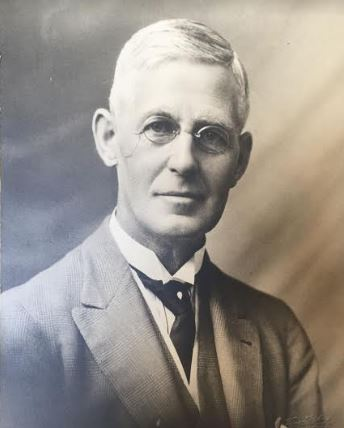
- Born: 11 January 1867; Southampton, England, UK
- Died: 14 August 1938 (aged 71); Cape Town, South Africa
- Spouse: Carlotta Elvira de Conceciao Forssman
- Children: Magnus Herbert Forssman Penny, Eric James Philip Penny, Linda Louise Hildegard Freeman, Nora Henrietta Elvira Rowlands

Herbert Penny was a well known Cape Town Auctioneer, Estate and Financial Agent, who was instrumental in the creation of the South African Division of the Royal Naval Volunteer Reserves, the precursor to the present day South African Navy.

== Family and early life ==
Herbert Penny was born 11 January 1867 in Southampton, England. He married Carlotta Elvira de Conceciao Forssman (daughter of Chavalier OA Fossman of Sweden) and had two sons and two daughters. Penny descends from Richard Penny of Marchwood.

== Career ==
Penny arrived in the Cape Colony in 1889 as a ship's officer in the Union Steamship Company that operated a fleet of passenger liners and cargo ships between Europe and Africa.

Prior to the outbreak of the Second Boer War in October 1899, Penny served as a company secretary in Johannesburg (during the Jameson Raid in 1895), prior to his appointment as General Manager of a coal mine in Middelburg, Transvaal. During this South African War, the mine was closed and Penny moved to Cape Town at the time hostilities commenced. He joined the staff of a bank and later was Chief Inspector of the Harbour Board. He started his own business, Herbert Penny Pty Ltd., and "Penny for Property" Estate Agents, Auctioneers and Sworn Appraisers, of Lennons Building, 30, Adderley Street, Cape Town, in 1906.

== Maritime interests and other activities ==
While having started his career by going to sea, Penny took a keen interest during his later life in the Cape region, in anything connected with the sea. Up to his death he was President of the Navy League of South Africa. He originated the scheme for the bronze Birkenhead Memorial plaque, which was erected by the Navy League in 1936 to commemorate the loss of the soldiers, sailors and civilians on board HMS Birkenhead on 26 February 1852 at Gansbaai. The original memorial plaque can be found today at the foot of the Danger Point Lighthouse, near Gansbaai.

During his ten years Honorary Secretaryship of the Navy League of South Africa, he initiated the formation of the Royal Naval Volunteer Reserve of South Africa in around 1904 culminating in 1905 which ultimately led to the formation of the South African Navy.

He was a member of the Board of Management, the Cape Town Chamber of Commerce; Chairman of the Institute of Auctioneers and Estate Agents, Cape Province; and Chairman of other political and social institutions.

== Philanthropy ==
In addition to his interest in the sea, he played a great part in helping various charitable concerns in the Cape. Among others, he was Founder and Chairman of the committee of the Sunshine Home for children at Belville Cape Town. He was a foundation member of the Boy Scouts' Association in South Africa.

== Issue ==
His eldest son, Magnus Penny, fought in the First World War and gained the rank of Lieutenant-Commander in the service of the Royal Navy Volunteer Reserve. He lived to the age of 90, dying on 4 July 1984. Magnus Penny's eldest son, Errol Forssman Penny (father of Conrad Penny), served in the Second World War with the South African Union Defence Force's Duke of Edinburgh's Own Rifles in East and North Africa (Western Desert Campaign) from 1939 to 1944 and went behind German lines on reconnaissance.

== Death ==
Herbert Penny died 14 August 1938 at the age of 71 owing to heart-failure after a very short illness. The funeral in Cape Town was followed by a procession to the Woltemade cemetery in Maitland, Cape Town. The service was conducted by the Reverend Harold Beardmore, Royal Navy.

The pall-bearers were Colonel A. Beck, Secretary of the Navy League; Lieutenant Colonel W.E. Puntis OBE VD, Federal President of the Navy League; Mr R.H. Hawke, Mr D.K. Sloan, Nr T.E. Archer and MR T.A.F. Jackson.

His wife, Carlotta Elvira de Conceciao Forssman died before him on 27 September 1927.
