= VADS (organisation) =

UK database of visual arts collections

VADS (formerly an initialism for Visual Arts Data Service) is a service of the Library at the University for the Creative Arts (UCA) in the UK that provides digital images and other visual arts resources free and copyright cleared for use in UK higher education and further education.

It has provided services to the academic community since 3 March 1997, and has built up a portfolio of visual art collections comprising over 140,000 images.
