= Fax (surname) =

Fax is a surname. Notable people with the surname include:

- Elton Fax (1909–1993), American illustrator, cartoonist, and author
- Jesslyn Fax (1893–1975), American actress
- Mark Fax (1911–1974), American composer
- Matt Fax (born 1996), French electronic musician and record producer
