= Data Availability and Transparency Act 2022 =

Australian government legislation

Data Availability and Transparency 2022

Parliament of Australia
- Long title: An Act to authorise the sharing of public sector data, and for related purposes
- Citation: No 11 of 2022
- Territorial extent: Australia
- Passed by: Australian House of Representatives
- Passed: 30 March 2022
- Passed by: Senate
- Passed: 30 March 2022
- Assented to: 31 March 2022
- Commenced: 1 April 2022
- Date of expiry: 1 April 2027

Legislative history

Initiating chamber: Australian House of Representatives
- Bill title: Data Availability and Transparency Act 2020
- Introduced by: Stuart Robert
- First reading: 9 December 2020
- Second reading: 30 March 2022
- Third reading: 30 March 2022

Revising chamber: Senate
- Bill title: Data Availability and Transparency Act 2022
- First reading: 30 March 2022
- Second reading: 30 March 2022
- Third reading: 30 March 2022

Final stages
- Finally passed both chambers: 30 March 2022

Keywords
- data sharing
- Status: In force

The Data Availability and Transparency Act 2022 (Cth) (DAT Act) is an Act of the Australian Parliament that authorises and regulates access to data held by the Australian Government.

The Australian Parliament passed the Act into law in March 2022. The Act came into effect on 1 April 2022.

The Act creates a public-sector data sharing scheme that permits Australian Government (Commonwealth) bodies to share their data with other Commonwealth bodies, Australian state or territory government bodies, or Australian universities; these entities must be accredited, before they can obtain and use the data.

The Act requires that any sharing of data under the scheme must:

- be for one or more of the permitted data sharing purposes;
- be consistent with data sharing principles; and
- within a data sharing agreement.

The Act specifically precludes sharing of data under the scheme for law enforcement-related purposes or national security purposes. If the shared data includes personal information, privacy protections also apply.

The Act permits sharing of data under the scheme for three purposes only:

- delivery of government services;
- informing government policy and programs; and
- research and development.

The Act establishes a National Data Commissioner to be the regulator of this data sharing scheme.
