= Families and Children Study =

Longitudinal study in Great Britain

The Families and Children Study (FACS) is a longitudinal study collecting information about families with dependent children in Great Britain, managed by the Department for Work and Pensions (DWP).

== History ==
Originally, the FACS was known as the Survey of Low Income Families (SOLIF) which was set up in 1999 as a new survey for Britain’s lone parent families and low-income couples with dependent children. Six annual waves have been completed so far. From the third wave in 2001 onwards, the survey was renamed FACS and was extended to high-income families in order to represent a complete sample of British families.

Topics covered in the FACS so far have been, for example, health and well-being, behaviour and childcare provision, use of local services, education and training, employment, family income, receipt of benefits and material deprivation. The FACS pursues amongst others the long term objective to eradicate child poverty within a generation within the Government’s Public Service Agreement. Other objectives include the evaluation of the Government’s work incentive measures, to compare living standards of families across Great Britain and across the income distribution, and to observe changes in the above.

The study is carried out by the National Centre for Social Research (NatCen) on behalf of the Department for Work and Pensions (DWP). Other sponsors are the Department for Children, Schools and Families (DCSF) and the Department for Transport (DfT).

== Methodology and scope ==
The main methods of data collection are face-to-face interviews as well as self-completion questionnaires. The mother is the main respondent but partners are interviewed, too, and in certain waves children aged 11 to 15 are also given questionnaires.

The sample includes about 7,000 families per wave and the FACS has effectively become a “true panel” with 1999 respondents being re-interviewed in the subsequent waves between 2000 and 2004. Additionally, new families have been included each year to increase the sample size and to allow representative cross-section as well as longitudinal comparison.

== Survey results ==
A list of publications that have used the FACS is available from the Economic and Social Data Service website.

== Re-using the data ==
The data and additional study information are available on the Economic and Social Data Service (ESDS) website . Users will have to register in order to access the download section.
