= Arts and Humanities Data Service =

UK digital collection organization

The Arts and Humanities Data Service (AHDS) was a United Kingdom national service aiding the discovery, creation and preservation of digital resources in and for research, teaching and learning in the arts and humanities. It was established in 1996 and ceased operation in 2008 (although the website and related digital collections are still accessible).

Organised via a Managing Executive at King's College London and five AHDS Centres, hosted by various UK Higher Education Institutions, the AHDS was funded until the end of March 2008 by the Joint Information Systems Committee and the Arts and Humanities Research Council (AHRC).

However, in March 2007 the AHRC decided to cease funding for the AHDS beyond March 2008. As a result, the AHDS is now advising AHRC applicants to ensure their projects include a budget for the costs of preservation and sustainability (whether with the AHDS or another service).

Following the demise of AHDS, and the cessation of the Methods Network, the Centre for e-Research (CeRch) was established at King's College London in 2008. The Centre's aims are to facilitate interdisciplinary, institutional, national and international collaboration.

The five subject-based AHDS Centres are:

- AHDS Archaeology — University of York
- AHDS History — University of Essex
- AHDS Literature, Languages and Linguistics — Oxford University
- AHDS Performing Arts — HATII at the University of Glasgow
- AHDS Visual Arts — University for the Creative Arts (Farnham campus)

Specific areas of work that the Arts and Humanities Data Service covers include:

- digital preservation — including a series of preservation handbooks detailing specific preservation issues with various digital file formats and information on its digital repository
- Advice on digitization — including a series of case studies of existing digitization projects, information papers on specific issues in digitization, and longer Guides to Good Practice dealing with digitization topics in particular arts and humanities disciplines
- Online collections created by universities and museums in the UK. These include:
  - An online catalogue with details of collections held within the archive
  - Designing Shakespeare — 40 years of Shakespearian performance in London and Stratford
  - The Stormont Papers - Parliamentary debates from Northern Ireland from 1921 to 1972.
