= UK Data Service =

Organization

- Formation: October 2012 (consolidating previous services)
- Type: Government-funded research infrastructure
- Purpose: Advancing social science research and teaching through access to data, documentation, guidance and support
- Headquarters: University of Essex, Colchester
- Region served: UK and abroad
- Director: Dr Steve McEachern
- Affiliations: ESRC, UK Data Archive
- Website: ukdataservice.ac.uk

The UK Data Service is the largest digital repository for quantitative and qualitative social science and humanities research data in the United Kingdom. The organisation is funded by the UK government through the Economic and Social Research Council and is led by the UK Data Archive at the University of Essex, in partnership with other universities.

The service is free to data owners and free at the point of use to non-commercial data users.

== History ==
The organisation developed from the UK Data Archive, established at Essex University in 1967. Its funder, the Economic and Social Research Council (part of UK Research and Innovation) established the UK Data Service in its current form in October 2012. Besides the UK Data Archive, the partners are:

- Cathie Marsh Institute for Social Research, University of Manchester
- Jisc, a not-for-profit technology supplier
- EDINA, University of Edinburgh
- Department of Information Studies, University College London
- Centre for Advanced Spatial Analysis, University College London

=== International reputation ===
The organisation frequently advise at a national and international level on data governance, ethics and confidentiality. They advised the Cabinet office on its development of the draft data ethics framework, which influenced the implementation of the Digital Economy Act 2017, and are often called upon to input into government White Papers around the use of data for research.

In October 2013, the UK Data Service received additional funding to coordinate the Administrative Data Research Network (ADRN), the predecessor to ADR-UK, designed to streamline research access to data routinely collected by UK government departments and other agencies.

UK Data Service is listed in the Registry of Research Data Repositories, re3data.org. It is part of the "trusted research environment" provided by the Office for National Statistics.

The UK Data Service also enabled continued research access to data throughout the pandemic and the first COVID-19 datasets were made available in July 2020. Within six months of the pandemic they held their first online COVID-19 data dive with researchers and policy makers across the UK and beyond.

== Data access ==
The UK Data Service is commissioned to provide data access and support for researchers from all sectors including higher education, central and local government, foundations, charities and business. There are currently more than 6,000 datasets available from a variety of sources. Key data types include:

- UK Census data
- Government-funded surveys (such as Labour Force Survey and Health Survey for England)
- Longitudinal studies (such as the British Household Panel Survey and the Millennium Cohort Study)
- Cross-national surveys (such as European Social Survey and Eurobarometer)
- International macrodata (such as statistics from the World Bank and International Monetary Fund)
- Business microdata
- Qualitative and mixed methods data

Access to the data catalogue, documentation and guides are available free of charge. Registration may be required to download data, and its use subject to licensing requirements specified by data owners. Most data are available under a standard End User Licence, but data are available along a spectrum ranging from 'open' to 'secure'. The latter requires specific approval and training to ensure the appropriate level of security for highly detailed and sensitive data.

== Data skills training and guidance ==
Their comprehensive learning resources in their Learning hub, training events and on-demand webinars relate to several innovative aspects of data-intensive social science research, alongside the foundations of research using quantitative and qualitative data. Whether new to research, new undergraduates or teachers; veteran data analysts, career researchers or data managers; there is likely to be some training or best practice guidance that will be useful.

From understanding more about how to use large national surveys, Census or qualitative data, through to the many innovations, including those in modelling, simulation, big data, web-scraping, social media and more, we continue to enable researchers to access, manage and explore data.

== Experts in research data management ==
The organisation publishes policies, procedures and protocols to help other national and international organisations, researchers and data providers to manage research data more effectively. They promote and maintain metadata standards for describing collections and data in the social sciences and their approach to data preparation and curation, and the standards they use, mean that data can be accessed now and in the future.

Through the UK Data Archive they continue to be at the forefront of developing international standards for data processing, both quantitative and qualitative.

== Experts in data quality and replicability ==
As part of their commitment to making sure research is replicable, their work with DataCite and the British Library helps researchers and data depositors cite data correctly, thereby helping demonstrate real value and impact to the data collections they hold. They ensure data follows the FAIR principles of being Findable, Accessible, Interoperable and Reusable, thereby enhancing the quality and replicability of the data. Their guidance to improve data citation across social science, along with their easy-to-use citation tool helps researchers cite data as they would other sources.

Social science research benefits from accountability and transparency, which can usefully be underpinned by high quality and trustworthy data. Rigorous data curation practices are still sometimes viewed as a dark art, and easy-to-use tools to correct and clean numeric data are not widely used, despite awareness of the desire to make data FAIR. Their innovative, open source QAMyData tool provides a health check for numeric data and helps repository staff check, clean and document data.

== Digital preservation and archiving ==
The UK Data Service follows a policy of active preservation to ensure the authenticity, reliability and logical integrity of all digital resources while providing usable versions for research, teaching or learning, in perpetuity.

The UK Data Service is based around a functional model, which in turn is based on the Open Archival Information System or OAIS (an ISO standard). This means that the UK Data Service works with standards for archiving digital materials to build trust relationships: researchers must trust that archivists are giving them the 'right' data, and data owners and producers must trust that the archivists are not damaging the integrity of their data.

The UK Data Service adheres to the UK Data Archive Preservation Policy, which codifies long-standing archival practice standards. This policy conforms to the OAIS reference model, with additions and alterations specific to the materials held within the UK Data Service collection. The policy holds strict requirements for digital preservation activities, together with how these requirements can best be achieved in keeping with regulatory requirements, archival best practice, information security and funding constraints.

== Data sharing and reuse ==
The UK Data Service encourages data sharing and reuse as a means to extend the inherent value in primary data for replicating research results as well as for additional analysis and teaching use. To this end, it supports the ESRC's Research Data Policy, which requires researchers funded by the research council to commit to a structured data management plan to enable data produced in the course of research to be deposited and archived for future sharing and reuse. To support researchers in developing robust data management plans, the UK Data Service makes a toolkit of resources available in formats designed for researchers as well as those responsible for teaching data management skills.

== Experts in safe research using controlled data ==
Information security is at the heart of the UK Data Service and flows through everything they do. Lead partner, the UK Data Archive at the University of Essex, was the first university to be awarded ISO27001 certification, an international standard of information security. Working closely with HMRC DataLab and the Office for National Statistics Secure Research Services, they developed safe research protocols including the Five Safes Framework to enable secure research access to data while protecting confidentiality.

Accredited in 2020 by the UK Statistic Authority under the Digital Economy Act 2017, they continue to provide a more streamlined pathway for researchers to securely access controlled data they need for research.

UK Data Service partners have a long history of contributing to best practice in trustworthy repositories. Also in 2020, they helped to develop CoreTrustSeal, which sets out international requirements for trusted data repositories. This demonstrates their expertise to perform all of the relevant activities relating to providing long-term access to data of value to social science researchers.

They also advised on the creation of the SafePod Network (SPN) launched in 2021 that enables wider geographical research access to sensitive data.

== Structure and governance ==
The Economic and Social Research Council (ESRC) in its current form established the UK Data Service in October 2012, after originally setting up and funding the organisation in earlier forms since 1967. The governance structure is managed by the ESRC.

Additional funding from other UK Research and Innovation (UKRI) councils includes the Engineering and Physical Sciences Research Council (EPSRC) that enables specific projects such as the Smart Energy Research Lab (SERL), and European based projects and investments such as the Consortium of European Social Science Data Archives (CESSDA) and Synergies for Europe's Research Infrastructure in the Social Sciences (SERISS).

== Advisory committee ==
Following the establishment of UKRI in 2018, the new national body that brought together all UK Research Councils, Innovate UK and Research England, the strategic oversight and provision to the ESRC of independent assurance for the UK Data Service has been undergoing change.

A new advisory committee for the UK Data Service was established in 2019 and meets twice a year. The advisory committee for the UK Data Service is the independent body with responsibility to ensure that the investment is developed, managed and maintained in a manner that maximises its benefit as a long-term scientific resource of importance both nationally and internationally. As an independent body, advisory committee members act as critical friends in relation to the overall shape, academic direction and relevance to policy and practice of the UK Data Service, advising on its general strategy in order for it to achieve its overall objectives. Scientific and/methodological advice may also be sought from external, independent sources.
