= UK Data Archive =

UK government agency

Coordinates: 51°52′39.7″N 0°56′50″E

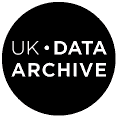
- Formation: 1967
- Legal status: Government-funded digital repository for research data
- Location: University of Essex
- Region served: UK and abroad
- Director: Prof Matthew Woollard
- Affiliations: ESRC, University of Essex, UK Data Service
- Website: www.data-archive.ac.uk

The UK Data Archive is a national centre of expertise in data archiving in the United Kingdom. It houses the largest collection of social sciences and population digital data in the UK. It is certified under CoreTrustSeal as a trusted digital repository. It is also certified under the international ISO 27001 standard for information security. Located in Colchester, the UK Data Archive is a specialist department of the University of Essex, co-located with the Institute for Social and Economic Research (ISER). It is primarily funded by the Economic and Social Research Council (ESRC) and the University of Essex.

Many of the data services formerly hosted by the UK Data Archive joined the ESRC-funded UK Data Service, established 1 October 2012.

The UK Data Archive is listed in the Registry of Research Data Repositories re3data.org.

== Scope and purpose ==
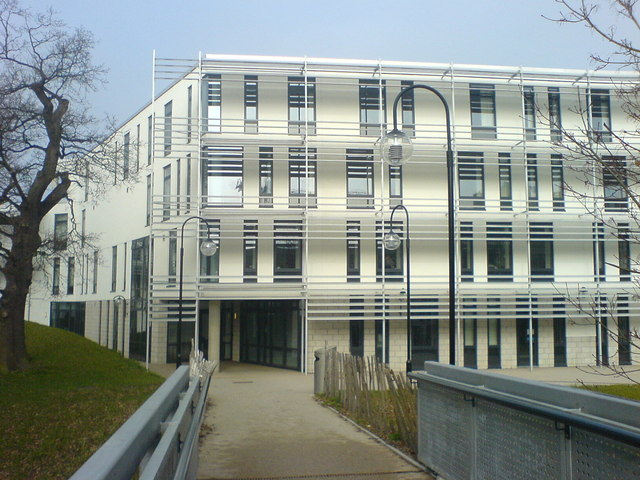
UK Data Archive on the University of Essex main campus

The UK Data Archive supports social science research and teaching by acquiring, developing and managing data and related digital resources for secondary use.

The Archive hosts and manages the UK Data Service, which provides free research access to over 6,000 social science data sets, including quantitative data and qualitative data from a wide range of disciplines. Access to the data catalogue, including online documentation such as questionnaires, is completely open. The Archive removes data access barriers wherever possible, however registration is required to download data where there are disclosure risks.

A large part of the UK Data Archive's data collection consists of publicly funded data, especially large-scale statistical surveys such as the Labour Force Survey and Crime Survey for England and Wales. Another important source of data is the academic community, sponsored by the ESRC and other funding bodies. In this category belong studies such as Understanding Society and the Millennium Cohort Study. The Archive also provides access to important international macrodata series (aggregate data) such as those held by the Organisation for Economic Co-operation and Development (OECD), International Monetary Fund (IMF) and World Bank via its partnership with Mimas.

The UK Data Archive ensures that the data will be available not just to current researchers but also to future researchers through digital preservation and migration to new storage media as technology evolves.

To promote the use and re-use of its data, the UK Data Archive provides technical support and advice to users on how to access and use the data, and on data management issues. The UK Data Archive also works closely with national and international partners on data-related projects and initiatives.

== History ==
The UK Data Archive was founded in 1967 on the campus of the University of Essex as the Social Science Research Council (SSRC) Data Bank. (The SSRC was the original name of the ESRC.) Four years prior to that, in 1963, the SSRC co-funded the Social and Economic Archive Committee (SEAC) which was set up to investigate and propose solutions to the problem of sharing information about social surveys and the data generated by them. SEAC was particularly concerned that poor communication between researchers was leading to survey work being replicated, thus wasting both time and money, and that data were being sold to the United States, and therefore 'lost' to British researchers.

=== Change of name ===
Across the years, the UK Data Archive has changed its name several times, reflecting changes to both its role and funders. In 1972 it changed its name from SSRC Data Bank to the Survey Archive when the Government Statistical Service allowed government surveys to be archived with it. The Survey Archive, in its turn, became the SSRC Data Archive in 1982 when it began to archive data resources other than just survey data. When the SSRC changed its name to Economic and Social Research Council in 1984, the Archive changed its name again to the ESRC Data Archive.

In 1996, the UK Data Archive began to receive direct funding from Jisc in recognition of the support provided by the Archive for teaching and learning, and dropped ESRC from its name to become The Data Archive. Finally, in 2000, in order to reflect both its UK-wide remit and the importance of its role within an international context, the organization became the UK Data Archive. In 2007, the Archive's 40th year, it relocated to a new purpose-built building on the University of Essex campus along with the Institute for Social and Economic Research.

=== Expanding its scope ===
Over the decades, the UK Data Archive has evolved from an organization hosting a single service and supported by a single grant from the SSRC, to one that offers a wide range of services and activities, funded by a variety of sources.

In the 1980s the Archive began to get involved with a number of large data-oriented projects. Notable amongst these were the BBC Domesday Project and the Rural Areas Database. The trend to participate in projects increased through the 1990s up to the present, in particular with a string of projects funded by the European Commission, most of which have been orientated toward research and development work and the advancement of technical solutions. They include Nesstar, FASTER, and the CESSDA-PPP project.

In the 1990s and early 2000s, in addition to these projects, the UK Data Archive developed a number of discrete yet interlinked services, most notably the Economic and Social Data Service (ESDS), Secure Data Service, and History Data Service. These services are now integrated into the UK Data Service, established in October 2012.

== Directors ==
Directors of the UK Data Archive are as follows:

- Allen Potter (1967-1970)
- Ken Macdonald (1972-1974)
- Ivor Crewe (1974-1982)
- Howard Newby (1983-1988)
- Catherine Hakim (1989-1990)
- Denise Lievesley (1991-1997)
- Kevin Schürer (2000-2010)
- Matthew Woollard (2010 to 2022)
- Joanne Webb (2022-)

== Collaborations ==
The UK Data Archive is a partner in delivering the UK Data Service, established and funded by the ESRC in October, 2012. Other host organisations include the Cathie Marsh Centre for Training at the University of Manchester; EDINA at the University of Edinburgh; and two units at University College London.

On a national level, the UK Data Archive works closely with its funders, the Economic and Social Research Council and Jisc, the Office for National Statistics and other key government data providers. It also has close links with the National Centre for e-Social Science and the National Centre for Research Methods. It has been designated a Place of Deposit for public records for The National Archives.

The UK Data Service is also the UK Service Provider for the CESSDA ERIC (Consortium of European Social Science Data Archives (CESSDA) as well as the US Inter-university Consortium for Political and Social Research (ICPSR) and the International Federation of Data Organizations (IFDO). It also contributes to the development of the Data Documentation Initiative.

== Former services ==
Many of the services once hosted by the UK Data Archive were consolidated under the UK Data Service in 2012. These services include the following.

=== Economic and Social Data Service ===
Economic and Social Data Service (ESDS) was a national data archiving and dissemination service founded in January 2003. It was funded jointly by the ESRC and Jisc and now forms the core of the UK Data Service.

=== History Data Service ===
The History Data Service was founded in 1992 as the History Data Unit. It was funded initially by the British Academy, the Leverhulme Trust and eventually jointly by the Arts and Humanities Research Council (AHRC) and Jisc. In 1996, the Arts and Humanities Data Service (AHDS) was set up comprising a managing executive and five service providers. The History Data Service, still hosted by the UK Data Archive, became one of these service providers, and thus formally became part of the AHDS, changing its name in the process to the History Data Service. In October 2003 AHDS service providers became 'subject centres' and all the subject centres of the AHDS were renamed, with History Data Service (HDS) becoming AHDS History. AHDS History ceased operation in 2008, but its successor, the History Data Service, continued to be hosted by the UK Data Archive, which retains a commitment to providing curation and preservation services for the historical community.

In addition to its data collection, the History Data Service supported online services that provide access to important census report material. These include the Online Historical Population Reports (Histpop) web site, the Enclosure Maps database and the Contemporary and Historical Census Collections (CHCC).

=== Census.ac.uk ===
Launched in 2007, Census.ac.uk provided a one-stop gateway to data and support services for users and researchers from higher education and further education in the UK to access census data from the 1971, 1981, 1991 and 2001 censuses. Census.ac.uk built on the work of the Census Registration Service (CRS) project (2001-2006), also based at the UK Data Archive, which provided a one-stop access and registration service for the same range of users and data. Census.ac.uk offered additional services, including centralized searching across all census resources, help and support for users, census guides, workshops and online training materials.

These services are now provided through the Census Support program of the UK Data Service.

=== Rural Economy and Land Use Programme (Relu) Data Support Service ===
Interdisciplinary research data of Relu projects are archived at the UK Data Archive, in addition to the Environmental Information Data Centre. The Rural Economy and Land Use Programme Data Support Service (Relu-DSS) provided data support for Relu projects. Relu projects investigate the social, economic, environmental and technological challenges faced by rural areas in the United Kingdom in an interdisciplinary manner, and involve the integration of social, economical, biological, agricultural and environmental science data.

Relu-DSS offered an interdisciplinary data support service, coordinated between the UK Data Archive and the Centre for Ecology and Hydrology (CEH) at Lancaster, with the lead being taken by the UK Data Archive. Relu-DSS also provided the UK Data Archive and CEH with sufficient information to enable them to plan for the management, longer-term preservation and re-use of Relu datasets.

Today the UK Data Archive still hosts the Relu Knowledge Portal which provides advice on data management, data sharing and preservation to Relu grant holders and applicants, and links to third-party data sources.

=== Secure Data Service ===
The Secure Data Service was established and funded by the ESRC in 2009 to help approved members of the research community access data that were previously considered too sensitive, detailed, confidential or potentially disclosive to be made available under standard licensing and dissemination arrangements. The service became fully operational in 2010, before becoming integrated into the UK Data Service in 2012. It is now called Secure Lab.

In order to become accredited as an Approved Researcher under the Office for National Statistics criteria, users must provide information about their bona fides and their proposed research. They are also required to undergo training on how to use Secure Lab, on the principles of statistical disclosure control, and on their legal rights and responsibilities. They are then able to access the data remotely, perform analyses on the data, and work collaboratively with others, all within the confines of a secure server. All data remain on the secure server, and final publications are only able to be removed after careful vetting for statistical disclosure issues.

=== Survey Resources Network ===
The Survey Resources Network was established in 2008 to coordinate and develop ESRC-funded activities related to survey research methods. The service was coordinated from the University of Essex under the Directorship of Professor Peter Lynn and with partners at four other academic centres. It ceased to operate as a network on 31 January 2012, however its Survey Question Bank remains a valuable resource; it has been extended, improved and rebranded as the UK Data Service Variable and Question Bank.

=== UKDA StatServe ===
UKDA StatServe was a service provided by the UK Data Archive (2008-2010) for creating tailor-made figures and tables from the data from the UK Data Archive’s catalogue. This service produced statistics (including frequency counts and cross tabulations using either single datasets or more complex time series) for customers who are not in a position to analyze the underlying data themselves.

=== ESRC Data Store ===
Launched in 2008 as UKDA-store, ESRC Data Store was a self-archiving system for the storage and sharing of primary research data from the social and behavioural sciences. The initial phase was aimed at ESRC award holders, who are required to offer data outputs for sharing under the terms of their award contract.

In 2012 ESRC Data Store was incorporated into the UK Data Service, and in 2014 it was extended and improved under the name ReShare. Today ReShare accepts digital data from researchers beyond the social sciences, and offers access to open and safeguarded data collections for anyone involved in social science research and learning. Data can be found via Discover, the discovery portal of the UK Data Service.

== See also ==
- Digital curation
- Digital preservation
- Data management
- Secondary data
