= What So Proudly We Hailed =

What So Proudly We Hailed and similar phrases could refer to:

- "...What so proudly we hailed... ", a phrase from the national anthem of the United States, "The Star-Spangled Banner"
- What So Proudly We Hail, The American Soul In Story, Speech, And Song, a 2011 book edited by Amy A. Kass, Leon R. Kass, and Diana Schaub
- What So Proudly We Hailed, a 1935 book by Emile Gauvreau
- What so proudly we hailed, a 1968 book by Fred J. Cook
- What So Proudly We Hailed: Francis Scott Key, A Life, a 2014 book by Marc Leepson
- What We So Proudly Hail, an album by American singer Bing Crosby
