= Oxenhorn =

Oxenhorn is a surname. Notable people with the surname include:

- Harvey Oxenhorn (1952–1990), American academic and author
- Mera J. Flaumenhaft (née Oxenhorn, 1945–2018), American academic and translator
- Joseph Oxenhorn (1914–1989), American educator and author
- Wendy Oxenhorn, American businesswoman and musician
