= Expanded access =

Program providing access to unapproved drugs or medical devices

Expanded access or compassionate use is the use of an unapproved drug or medical device under special forms of investigational new drug applications (IND) or IDE application for devices, outside of a clinical trial, by people with serious or life-threatening conditions who do not meet the enrollment criteria for the clinical trial in progress.

These programs go under various names, including early access, special access, or managed access program, compassionate use, compassionate access, named-patient access, temporary authorization for use, cohort access, and pre-approval access.

In general, the person and their doctor must apply for access to the investigational product, the company has to choose to cooperate, and the medicine's regulatory agency needs to agree that the risks and possible benefits of the drug or device are understood well enough to determine if putting the person at risk has sufficient potential benefit. In some countries the government will pay for the drug or device, but in many countries the person must pay for the drug or device, as well as medical services necessary to receive it.

In the US, compassionate use started with the provision of investigational medicine to certain patients in the late 1970s, and a formal program was established in 1987 in response to HIV/AIDS patients requesting access to drugs in development. An important legal case was Abigail Alliance v. von Eschenbach, in which the Abigail Alliance, a group that advocates for access to investigational drugs for people who are terminally ill, tried to establish such access as a legal right. The Supreme Court declined to hear the case, effectively upholding previous cases that have maintained that there is not a constitutional right to unapproved medical products.

== Programs ==
As of 2016, regulation of access to pharmaceuticals that were not approved for marketing was handled on a country by country basis, including in the European Union, where the European Medicines Agency issued guidelines for national regulatory agencies to follow. In the US, Europe, and the EU, no company could be compelled to provide a drug or device that it was developing.

Companies sometimes provide drugs under these programs to people who were in clinical trials and who responded to the drug, after the clinical trial ends.

=== United States ===
In the US as of 2018, people could try obtain unapproved drugs or medical devices that were in development under specific conditions.

These conditions were:

- The person wanting the drug or device and a licensed physician are both willing to participate.
- The person's physician determines that there is no comparable or satisfactory therapy available to diagnose, monitor, or treat the patient's disease or condition.
- That the probable risk to the person from the investigational product is not greater than the probable risk from the disease or condition.
- The FDA determines that there is sufficient evidence of the safety and effectiveness of the investigational product to support its use in the particular circumstance;
- The FDA determines that providing the investigational product will not interfere with the initiation, conduct, or completion of clinical investigations to support marketing approval;
- The sponsor (generally the company developing the investigational product for commercial use) or the clinical investigator (or the patient's physician in the case of a single patient expanded access request) submits a clinical protocol (a document that describes the treatment plan for the patient) that is consistent with FDA's statute and applicable regulations for INDs or investigational device exemption applications (IDEs), describing the use of the investigational product; and
- The person is unable to obtain the investigational drug or device under another IND application (for drugs), IDE application (for devices), or to participate in a clinical trial.

Drugs can be made available to individuals, small groups, or large groups.

In the US, actual provision of the drug depends on the manufacturer's willingness to provide it, as well as the person's ability to pay for it; it is the company's decision whether to require payment or to provide the drug or device for free. To promote transparency regarding this decision-making, the 21st Century Cures Act requires pharmaceutical companies to make their expanded access policies publicly available. However, a 2021 analysis found that while large companies have largely complied, smaller firms frequently fail to post these required policies. The manufacturer can only charge direct costs for individual INDs; it can add some but not all indirect costs for small group or larger expanded access programs. To the extent that a doctor or clinic is required for use of the drug or device, they too may require payment.

In some cases, it may be in the manufacturer's commercial interest to provide access under an EA program; this is a way, for example, for a company to make money before the drug or device is approved. Companies must provide data collected from people getting the drug or device under EA programs to the FDA annually; this data may be helpful with regard to getting the drug or device approved, or may be harmful, should unexpected adverse events occur. The manufacturer remains legally liable as well. If the manufacturer chooses to charge for the investigational product, that price influences later discussions about the price if the product is approved for marketing.

==== State law ====
As of February 2019, 41 states have passed right-to-try laws that permit manufacturers to provide experimental medicines to terminally ill people without US FDA authorization. Legal, medical, and bioethics scholars, including Jonathan Darrow and Arthur Caplan, have argued that these state laws have little practical significance because people can already obtain pre-approval access through the FDA's expanded access program, and because the FDA is generally not the limiting factor in obtaining pre-approval access.

=== Europe ===
In Europe, the European Medicines Agency issued guidelines that members may follow. Each country has its own regulations, and they vary. In the UK, for example, the program is called "early access to medicine scheme" or EAMS and was established in 2014. If a company that wants to provide a drug under EAMS, it must submit its Phase I data to the Medicines and Healthcare products Regulatory Agency and apply for what is called a "promising innovative medicine" (PIM) designation. If that designation is approved, the data is reviewed, if that review is positive, the National Health Service is obligated to pay for people who fit the criteria to have access to the drug. As of 2016, governments also paid for early access to drugs in Austria, Germany, Greece, and Spain. Since 2021, France has a system of early and expanded access separated in two systems: AAC and AAP.

Companies sometimes make use of expanded programs in Europe even after they receive EMA approval to market a drug, because drugs also must go through regulatory processes in each member state, and in some countries this process can take nearly a year; companies can start making sales earlier under these programs.

=== Philippines ===
In the Philippines, the usage of unregistered drugs may be allowed through a doctor, a specialist, or health institution or society obtaining a specific compassionate use permit (CSP) from the country's Food and Drug Administration for the treatment of their terminally or seriously ill patients. The issuance of CSP is stated under Department of Health Administrative Order No. 4 of 1992.

Those seeking CSP are required to provide the following information; estimated amount of the unregistered drug the patient, the "licensed drug/device establishment through which the unregistered drug may be procured", and "the names and address of the specialists qualified and authorized to use the product." A CSP may also be obtained for processed medical cannabis despite cannabis in general being illegal in the Philippines.

== History ==
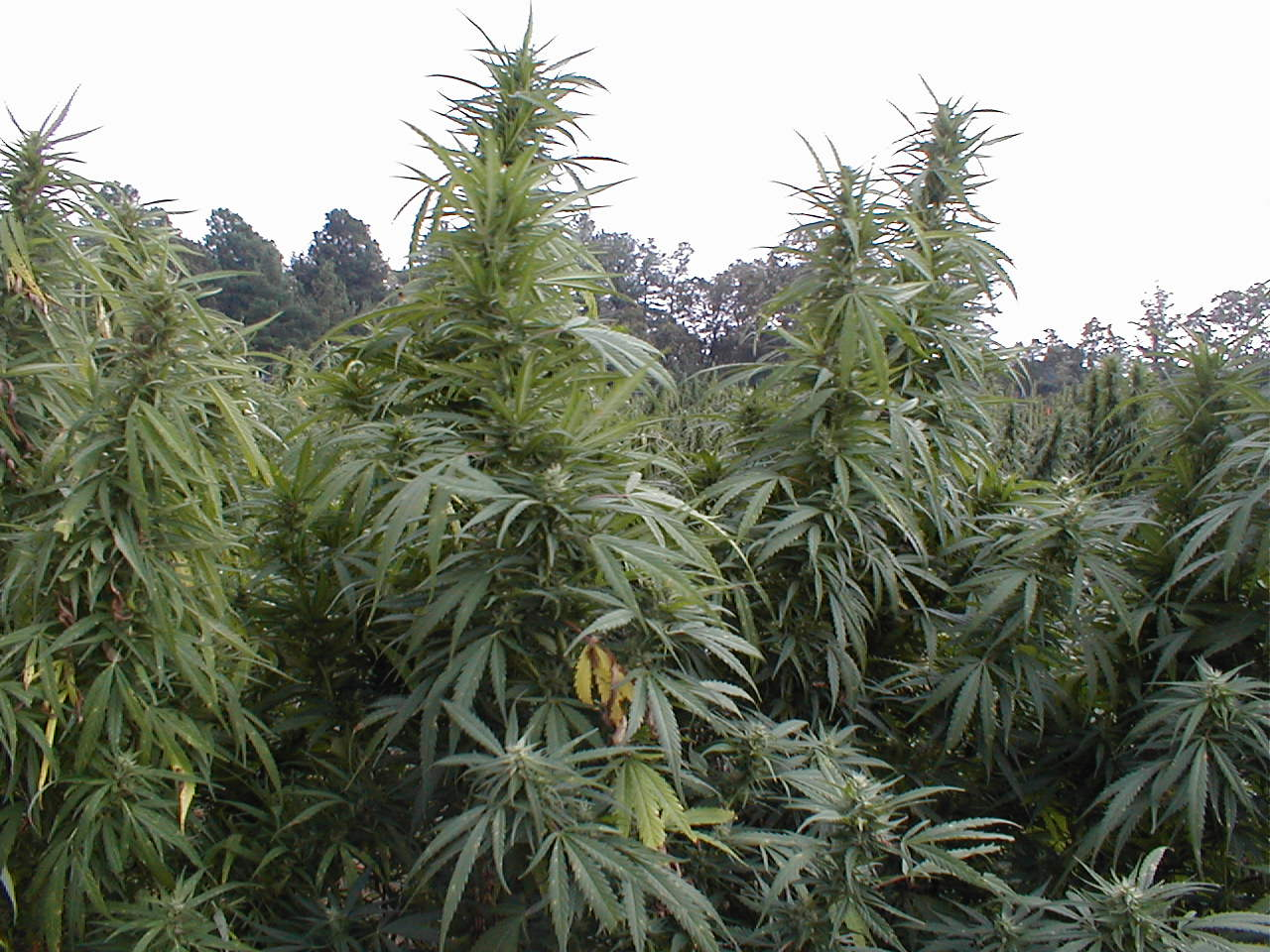
Medicinal cannabis farmed by the University of Mississippi for the government

In the US, one of the earliest expanded access programs was a compassionate use IND that was established in 1978, which allowed a limited number of people to use medical cannabis grown at the University of Mississippi, under the direction of Marijuana Research Project Director Dr. Mahmoud ElSohly. It is administered by the National Institute on Drug Abuse.

The program was started after Robert C. Randall brought a lawsuit (Randall v. United States) against the FDA, the Drug Enforcement Administration, the National Institute on Drug Abuse, the Department of Justice, and the Department of Health, Education & Welfare. Randall, who had glaucoma, had successfully used the Common Law doctrine of necessity to argue against criminal charges of marijuana cultivation that had been brought against him, because his use of cannabis was deemed a medical necessity. On November 24, 1976, federal Judge James Washington ruled in his favor.

The settlement in Randall v. U.S. became the legal basis for the FDA's compassionate IND program. People were only allowed to use cannabis under the program who had certain conditions, like glaucoma, known to be alleviated with cannabis. The scope was later expanded to include people with AIDS in the mid-1980s. At its peak, fifteen people received the drug. 43 people were approved for the program, but 28 of the people whose doctors completed the necessary paperwork never received any cannabis. The program stopped accepting new people in 1992 after public health authorities concluded there was no scientific value to it, and due to President George H. W. Bush administration's policies. As of 2011, four people continued to receive cannabis from the government under the program.

The closure of the program during the height of the AIDS epidemic led to the formation of the medical cannabis movement in the United States, a movement which initially sought to provide cannabis for treating anorexia and wasting syndrome in people with AIDS.

In November 2001 the Abigail Alliance for Better Access to Developmental Drugs was established by Frank Burroughs in memory of his daughter, Abigail. The Alliance seeks broader availability of investigational drugs on behalf of people with terminal illnesses. It is best known for a legal case, which it lost, Abigail Alliance v. von Eschenbach, in which it was represented by the Washington Legal Foundation. On August 7, 2007, in an 8–2 ruling, the U.S. Court of Appeals for the District of Columbia Circuit reversed an earlier ruling in favor of the Alliance. In 2008, the Supreme Court of the United States declined to hear their appeal. This decision left standing the appellate court decision that people who are terminal ill patients have no legal right to demand "a potentially toxic drug with no proven therapeutic benefit".

In March 2014, Josh Hardy, a 7-year-old boy from Virginia, made national headlines that sparked a conversation on pediatric access to investigational drugs when his family's request for brincidofovir was declined by the drug manufacturer, Chimerix. The company reversed its decision after pressure from cancer advocacy organizations, and Josh received the drug that saved his life. Hardy later died in September 2016 due to complications related to his underlying cancer diagnosis. In 2016 Kids v Cancer, a pediatric cancer advocacy organization, launched the Compassionate Use Navigator to assist physicians and guide families about the application process. Since then, FDA simplified the application process, but stressed that it cannot require a manufacturer to provide a product. FDA receives about 1,500 expanded access requests per year and authorizes 99% of it.

== See also ==
- Orphan drug
- Right-to-try law
- Emergency Use Authorization
