= Frank C. Dukepoo =

American geneticist, educator, and bioethics advocate

- Born: Parker, Arizona
- Died: October 28, 1999 (aged 56); Flagstaff, Arizona
- Citizenship: American
- Education: Arizona State University (BS, MS, PhD)
- Occupations: Geneticist, professor, educator

Frank Charles Dukepoo (January 29, 1943 – October 28, 1999) was an American geneticist, educator, and bioethics advocate from the Hopi community. He was the first member of the Hopi Nation to receive a PhD in human genetics and was known for his work on the genetics of Indigenous populations, his opposition to unethical DNA research, and his contributions to increasing Native participation in STEM.

== Early life and education ==
Dukepoo was born on January 29, 1943, in Parker, Arizona. He was one of 13 children and was originally named Pumatuhye Tsi Dukpuh. Pumatuhye means "first crop," and Tsi Dukpuh refers to the sack carried by Hopi snake dancers, who pray for rain to help crops grow.

He attended Arizona State University, where he received multiple scholarships, including the Arizona Republic News Carrier Scholarship, the United Indian Scholarship Service, the Bureau of Indian Affairs Scholarship, the John Hay Whitney Opportunity Fellowship, and the Ford Foundation Advanced Study Fellowship. Despite receiving support, he struggled in college, failing his first semester and losing his scholarships. However, with guidance from Charles M. Woolf, he improved his grades, regained financial aid, and continued his studies.

He received a bachelor's degree in biology, a master's in zoology, and a PhD in genetics and zoology from Arizona State University, making him one of the first Native Americans and the first Hopi to earn a doctorate in this field.

== Career and federal contributions ==
Following his doctoral studies, Dukepoo held faculty appointments at institutions including San Diego State University and Northern Arizona University (NAU). His early research included genetic studies of albinism and hereditary traits in Native populations; one of his early publications, coauthored with Charles M. Woolf, was "Hopi Indians, Inbreeding, and Albinism" in Science (1969).

Dukepoo engaged nationally on the ethical implications of genetic research involving Indigenous peoples. He participated in the National Bioethics Advisory Commission's July 1998 public meeting, where he described being "one of two" American Indian geneticists at the time and articulated concerns about consent, control, and cultural values in DNA research.

His federal service included roles at the National Cancer Institute (NCI) within the National Institutes of Health (NIH) in Washington, D.C., where he served as Executive Secretary of Education (1978–1980). He also advised the NIH, the National Science Foundation (NSF), the Centers for Disease Control and Prevention (CDC), and the Howard Hughes Medical Institute on Indigenous health and genetics policy. His critiques of the Human Genome Diversity Project became a notable mark of Indigenous bioethics.

== Advocacy and outreach ==
Dukepoo was a founding member of the National Native American Honor Society (1982), established to recognize academic achievement among Native youth and promote higher-education pathways. He was involved with the American Indian Science and Engineering Society (AISES) and the Society for the Advancement of Chicanos and Native Americans in Science (SACNAS) in outreach focused on increasing Native participation in STEM.

He created the Eagle Force program, which combined cultural values with science and technology education. It was implemented in schools across the Southwest through workshops and presentations directed at Native youth. Dukepoo co-authored the IPCB educational primer, Indians, Genes and Genetics: What Indians Should Know About the New Biotechnology (1998). Throughout his public talks and mentoring, Dukepoo promoted a "3 Ds" philosophy (Desire, Determination, Discipline), emphasizing perseverance in education and research.

His advocacy extended to participation in national policy and advisory proceedings on genomics and bioethics, including testimony before the National Bioethics Advisory Commission in 1998.

He also contributed to film and media projects that highlighted environmental and social issues. In 1983, he served as a consultant for the PBS documentary The Four Corners: A National Sacrifice Area?. He appeared as a featured speaker in the 1988 production The River That Harms. In 1993, he was the subject of The Frank Dukepoo Story, which received the Emmett Award for Educational Film Excellence.

In addition, he consulted with educational and scientific organizations and provided training to teachers and tribal groups on genetics education and ethics.

== Death and legacy ==
Dukepoo died of a heart attack on October 28, 1999, at the age of 56. A memorial tree and plaque were placed in his honor outside the Wettaw Science Building at Northern Arizona University.

His work and perspectives continue to be cited in science education and policy literature,

including Native American Scientists (1996) by Laura Baskes Litwin, 16 Extraordinary Native Americans (2001) by

Nancy Shuker, and Science and Native American Communities: Legacies of Pain, Visions of Promise (2001), edited by Keith James. His influence on genomic ethics and Indigenous data sovereignty is also discussed in later scholarship.

== Awards and recognition ==
Dukepoo received several awards during his lifetime, including recognition from AISES and honors noted in community and educational sources. Other listings include the Iron Eyes Cody Medal of Freedom and the Bo Jack Humanitarian Award. He was named Indian of the Year and also nominated for induction into the Native American Hall of Fame in 1995. In addition, Dukepoo was recognized as the Hopi of the Year and received the Lifetime Achievement Award in 1996 for service to Indian people.

Dukepoo's career and life were documented in Marion E. Gridley's Indians of Today (1971) and Laura Baskes Litwin's Native American Scientists (1996). These works described him as one of the first Hopi geneticists, noted his early challenges, and outlined his contributions to Native education and science. These publications also recognized him as a national role model for Native American students.

== Selected publications and public work ==
- Woolf, C. M.; Dukepoo, F. C. (1969). "Hopi Indians, Inbreeding, and Albinism". Science. 164 (3875): 30–37. doi:10.1126/science.164.3875.30.
- Dukepoo, F. C. (1998). "Genetic Services in the New Era: Native American Perspectives". Community Genetics 11(3): 153–160.
- Harmon, S. H. E. (1999). "It's More Than the Human Genome Diversity Project". Politics and the Life Sciences 18(2): 359–360.
- Harry, D.; Dukepoo, F. C. (1998). Indians, Genes and Genetics: What Indians Should Know About the New Biotechnology. IPCB.
