= Flaumenhaft =

Flaumenhaft is a surname. Notable people with the surname include:

- Harvey Flaumenhaft (born 1938), American scholar, media commentator, and academic administrator
- Mera J. Flaumenhaft (1945–2018), American academic and translator
