= Repugnant market =

A repugnant market is an area of commerce that is considered by society to be outside the range of market transactions and that bringing this area into the realm of a market would be inherently immoral or uncaring. For example, many people consider a market in human organs to be a repugnant market, or the ability to bet on terrorist acts in prediction market to be repugnant. Others consider the lack of such markets to be even more immoral and uncaring, as trade bans (e.g. in organ transplants and terrorism information) can create avoidable human suffering.

Nobel Laureate Alvin Roth (2007) "introduced in the economics literature the concept of "repugnance" for a transaction as the aversion toward other individuals engaging in it, even if the parties directly involved benefit from that trade (i.e. "There are some things no one should be allowed to do"). Repugnance considerations have important consequences on the types of markets and transactions that we observe and, as such, they impose a challenge for policy and market design."

== Examples ==
The repugnance of markets varies according to time, culture, and economic development, among other factors. Slavery is a market currently considered repugnant while for most of recorded history before c. 1000 AD it was considered acceptable, and was still considered acceptable against certain people groups until c. 1800 AD. Examples of markets considered repugnant at one time or place include:

- Pregnancy/early childhood
  - Abortion
  - Adoption
  - Egg donation for research purposes
  - Fetal organs and aborted fetal tissue
  - Surrogacy, legal in India and most states in the U.S. (but banned in France and Japan)
- Drugs and food
  - Illegal drug trade
  - Horse meat, whale meat, dog meats (e.g. in California), cat meat, beef in India, and the meat of endangered animals.
- Labour
  - Child labor
  - Slavery or indentured servitude
- Social status/political power
  - Citizenship and/or immigration (Investor visas such as the U.S. E-2 visa are exceptions. Several notable economists have proposed selling citizenship)
  - Education
  - Lobbying
  - Military mercenaries
  - Political corruption activities, such as bribery and influence peddling
  - Vote buying
- Money/speculation
  - Currency speculation
  - Gambling
  - Predatory lending, especially mortgage lending
  - Pyramid schemes and multi-level marketing
  - Selling short
  - Ticket touting in sports events and concerts
  - Usury (has never been allowed by Islam and was historically banned in Christian countries)

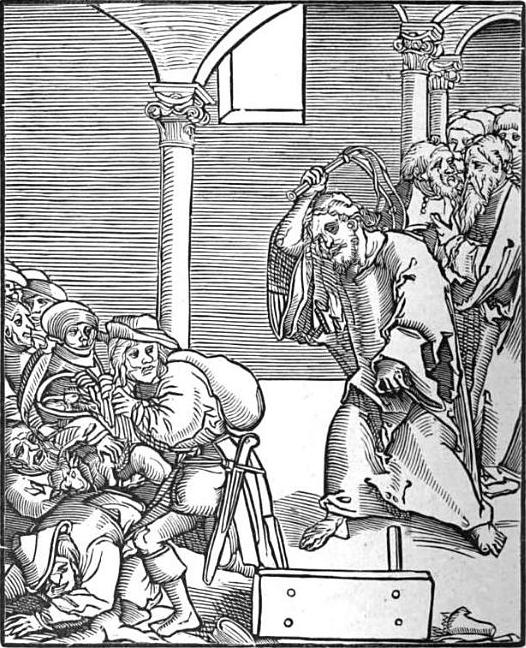
Christ drives the Usurers out of the Temple, a woodcut by Lucas Cranach the Elder in Passionary of Christ and Antichrist.

- Economic corruption/media power
  - Payola
  - Product placement in some European countries
  - Radio spectrum
- Sex
  - Pornography (repugnant in some countries/cultures, especially paraphiliac pornography)
  - Prostitution
    - Virginity
- Other
  - Certain prediction markets (e.g. 'terrorism futures market')
  - Healthcare
    - Medical debt
  - Organ trade and organ donation from a live donor (Turkey and the Philippines are notable exceptions)
  - Cadavers
  - Life insurance
  - Real estate in Cuba
  - Real estate broker/agent profession or flipping real estate
  - Metered parking
  - Contract killing
  - Simony
  - Odious debt

== See also ==
- Prohibitionism
- Repugnancy costs
- Taboo
- Yuck factor
