= President's Commission for the Study of Ethical Problems in Medicine and Biomedical and Behavioral Research =

The President's Commission for the Study of Ethical Problems in Medicine and Biomedical and Behavioral Research was a bioethics organization in the United States.

== Purposes ==
This Congressionally mandated group was formed in November 1978, by Public Law 95-622, succeeding the National Commission for the Protection of Human Subjects of Biomedical and Behavioral Research. It was created to study bio-ethical issues such as the effects of income and residence on the availability of healthcare, the definition of death, patient consent, human research subjects, and genetic engineering, counseling and testing. The commission met a total of 28 times and ultimately published 11 reports, two of which were made up of three volumes, on these topics and their implications. These reports expanded upon ideas originally established in the 1945 Nuremberg Codes and the Belmont Report. Additionally, a guidebook for Institutional Review Boards was published by the commission in 1981.

== History ==
Jimmy Carter appointed the eleven original members of the commission in July 1979 and the Senate confirmed Morris B. Abram as the chairman of the commission on September 29, 1979. The commissioners were sworn in by Judge David L. Bazelon at the White House on January 1, 1980, and proceeded to hold the first meeting that day. Six additional commissioners were sworn in as replacements were needed. The commission worked independently from January 1980 to March 31, 1983, when its authority expired. The meeting files, correspondences, and unpublished papers from the commission are currently held in the Bioethics Research Library Kennedy Institute of Ethics at Georgetown University. Multiple government formed organizations continued to fulfill the commission's purposes after its expiration, most specifically the Bioethical Medical Advisory Committee which was created in 1988.

== Publications ==
Its publications included:

- Defining Death (1981)
- Protecting Human Subjects (1981)
- Whistleblowing in Biomedical Research (1981)
- IRB Guidebook (1981)
- Compensating for Research Injuries (1982)
- Splicing Life: The Social and Ethical Issues of Genetic Engineering with Human Beings (1982)
- Making Health Care Decisions (1982)
- Deciding to Forego [sic] Life-Sustaining Treatment (1983)
- Implementing Human Research Regulations (1983)
- Screening and Counseling for Genetic Conditions: The Ethical, Social, and Legal Implications of Genetic Screening, Counseling, and Education Programs (1983)
- Securing Access to Health Care (1983)
- Summing Up (1983)

== Eleven Original Members Appointed by Jimmy Carter ==
- Morris B. Abram
- Mario Garcia-Palmieri
- Renee Claire Fox
- Albert Rupert Jonsen
- Patricia A. King
- Mathilde Krim
- Donald N. Medearis
- Arno G. Motulsky
- Fritz C. Redlich
- Anne A. Scitovsky
- Charles J. Walker

=== Replacement Commissioners and Years Sworn In ===
- Frances K. Graham (1980)
- Carolyn A. Williams (1980)
- George R. Dunlop (1982)
- Daher B. Rahi (1982)
- Seymour Siegel (1982)
- Lydia Hare Smith (1982)

== See also ==
- Human experimentation in the United States
- Biomedical Ethical Advisory Committee
- Advisory Committee on Human Radiation Experiments
- National Bioethics Advisory Commission
- President's Council on Bioethics
- Belmont Report
- Institutional Review Boards
