= Right-to-try law =

US laws allowing patients access to experimental drugs and therapies

Right-to-Try Laws
- In green: U.S. states with right-to-try laws
- Territorial extent: Federal: United States (Right to Try 1.0 only); State (RtT 1.0): 41 states State (RtT 2.0): 17 states
- Enacted: May 17, 2014 (first state, Colorado)
- Signed by: Donald Trump (federal)
- Signed: May 30, 2018 (federal)
- Introduced by: Sen. Ron Johnson (R–WI) (federal)

Related legislation
- Expanded access; Individualized Treatments Acts
- Status: In force

Right-to-try laws broadly are United States state laws and a federal law created with the intent to allow seriously ill patients access to experimental therapies (drugs, biologics, devices). Right-to-try 1.0 (RtT 1.0) allows terminally ill patients access to treatments that have completed Phase I testing but not been approved by the Food and Drug Administration (FDA) across the US, since a federal right-to-try law (RtT 1.0) passed in 2018, extending it across the USA. Right-to-try 2.0 (RtT 2.0) laws, also known as Individualized Treatments Acts, now passed in 17 states, expand patient access in two major ways: they include individuals with non-terminal, rare, or degenerative conditions, and they permit the use of individualized experimental therapies that have not completed Phase I testing.

Before right-to-try laws, patients needed complete FDA approval to use experimental drugs. The framers of these laws argue that this allows for individualized treatments not permitted under the FDA's current regulatory scheme. The value of these laws was questioned on multiple grounds, including that pharmaceutical manufacturers would have no obligation to provide the therapies being sought.

== States with right-to-try 1.0 laws ==
On May 17, 2014, Colorado became the first state to pass a right-to-try 1.0 law. As of August 2018, 41 states had enacted such laws: Alabama, Alaska, Arizona, Arkansas, California, Colorado, Connecticut, Florida, Georgia, Idaho, Iowa, Illinois, Indiana, Kentucky, Louisiana, Maine, Maryland, Michigan, Minnesota, Mississippi, Missouri, Montana, Nebraska, Nevada, New Hampshire, North Carolina, North Dakota, Ohio, Oklahoma, Oregon, Pennsylvania, South Carolina, South Dakota, Tennessee, Texas, Utah, Virginia, Washington, West Virginia, Wisconsin, and Wyoming.

In May 2023, Montana passed a bill expanding the state's Right to Try Act, expanding it to non-terminal patients.

== Federal right-to-try law ==
In January 2017, a federal right-to-try bill was introduced in the Senate by Republican Ron Johnson of Wisconsin. Johnson's bill passed the Senate on August 3, 2017, in a unanimous consent motion. Johnson had threatened to hold up a Senate vote on the FDA Reauthorization Act of 2017 (FDARA), a must-pass piece of legislation that allows the FDA to operate, if a right-to-try amendment was not added to it. He agreed to drop a hold on FDARA in exchange for a unanimous consent motion. A companion House bill was introduced in February 2017; the next month it was referred to the House Subcommittee on Crime, Terrorism, Homeland Security, and Investigations. On March 21, 2018, the House passed a right-to-try bill, sending it to the Senate for consideration. On May 22, the Senate passed S.204, the Trickett Wendler, Frank Mongiello, Jordan McLinn and Matthew Bellina Right to Try Act, and sent it to President Trump, who signed it on May 30, 2018, creating a uniform system for terminal patients seeking access to investigational treatments.

== Proponents ==
The chief advocate of right-to-try laws is the Goldwater Institute, a libertarian think tank based in Arizona, which created the model act on which the state laws are based. Kurt Altman, national policy adviser for the institute, has said that right-to-try laws return control of medical decisions "back to a local level". Other proponents include patients and their families, as well as patient advocate groups. Supporters of these laws sometimes describe them as "Dallas Buyers Club" bills, a reference to a movie about an American man with AIDS who smuggled unapproved treatments from foreign countries to fellow patients. Some have likened the efforts of terminally ill patients to procure unapproved drugs in development to those of ACT-UP and other AIDS organizations of the 1980s.

One ethical argument for the right to try unapproved treatments is that if patients have the right to die through physician-assisted suicide or voluntary euthanasia, they should also be afforded the right to try.

In 2016, Houston oncologist Dr. Ebrahim Delpassand testified to a US Senate committee considering passing the Trickett Wendler Right to Try Act of 2016, that he treated 78 patients for neuroendocrine cancer with LU-177 octreotate under the Texas Right to Try law, after the FDA refused permission to include those patients in the clinical trial that he was running. However, the drug's manufacturer, Advanced Accelerator Applications, has made this drug available through an expanded access program for patients with neuroendocrine tumors, so it is disputed whether this is a substantiated case of a right to try law being used to gain patients access to an investigational product. However, the latter program is extremely limited, as it is restricted to inoperable, somatostatin receptor positive, neuroendocrine tumors, that are progressive under somatostatin analogue therapy. State legislators in Texas and North Carolina have introduced bills that would expand state right-to-try laws to include stem cell and tissue based regenerative therapies currently in development and to allow patients with serious, chronic illness to use the right-to-try pathway.

== Further legislation ==
Expanded access beyond right-to-try followed after the federal law was enacted. In 2024, following calls for regulatory and legal change that will expand access to controlled substances among terminally ill populations, two legal cases related to expanded utilization of psilocybin are moving through the federal court system. The Advanced Integrative Medicine Science (AIMS) Institute in concert with the NPA filed a series of lawsuits seeking both the rescheduling of and expanded right to try access to psilocybin.

In April 2026, an executive order was signed to accelerate psychedelic research and access. The order specifically directs federal agencies to streamline right-to-try pathways for psychedelic-assisted therapies.

Right-to-Try 2.0 (RtT2) laws are United States state laws created by Individualized Treatments Acts with the intent to allow terminally ill patients access to individualized experimental therapies that have not completed Phase I testing.

== Critics ==
Bioethicists and other scholars have questioned the extent to which right-to-try laws will actually benefit patients. Jonathan Darrow, Arthur Caplan, Alta Charo, Rebecca Dresser, Alison Bateman-House and others have pointed out that the laws do not require physicians to prescribe experimental therapies, do not require insurance companies to pay for them, and do not require manufacturers to provide them. Because the laws do not actually provide a right to receive experimental therapies, they could be considered toothless legislation that offers only false hope to dying people. Even if the laws work as intended, they would be problematic to critics. Because the laws require only that drugs have completed the first of three phases of clinical testing, there is no data on the efficacy of the drugs, especially in very sick people. There is also no safety data on how they would affect very sick people. This makes informed consent on the part of the patient more difficult. Informed consent entails knowledge of the pros and cons of a proposed treatment, then a decision made in light of those pros and cons. Some states' right-to-try laws also put patients at risk of losing hospice or home health care, and the costs surrounding treatment can be prohibitive, something right-to-try laws do not fix. Alta Charo called the laws "a simplistic way of going after much more complicated issues."

Medical and health experts have also voiced concerns. If the laws were to grant patients access to unapproved drugs, they could hasten death or cause increased suffering. Peter Temin wrote that "there is always a chance that any given drug will fail to cure a condition or will induce an adverse reaction," such as becoming sick, or sicker, or even dying. Drugs that are not fully studied may lead to more adverse reactions in patients. The laws reduce FDA oversight of drug regulation. Another criticism is that state right-to-try laws may be unconstitutional, because they involve states regulating medicine despite federal legislation that regulates the interstate marketing of medicine. Various authors have predicted that right-to-try laws would be struck down if taken to court. A 2014 paper in JAMA Internal Medicine argued that right to try laws "seem likely to be futile."

In April 2017, oncologist David Gorski argued in Science-Based Medicine that the right-to-try law is harmful to society and is popular with a public who do not understand how the FDA works and is "placebo legislation" that makes lawmakers feel good but does "nothing concrete to help actual patients.". Gorski claims that right-to-try laws enable "cancer quacks" like Burzynski to operate for years and that "the real purpose of right-to-try laws is not to help patients, but to neuter the FDA's ability to regulate certain drugs, consistent with the source of this legislation." Gorski further states that these laws "rest on a fantasy... of false hope ... that is rooted in libertarian politics ... that claims that deregulation is the cure for everything."

In January 2019 Jann Bellamy added that the right-to-try does not ensure "that only patients who have no other treatment options receive access; that costs are appropriate; that informed consent is legally and ethically sound; and that the proposed treatment plan offers a favorable risk/benefit profile for the patient." Additionally, "there is no regulatory infrastructure spelling out just how patients and physicians should go about accessing investigational drugs or how drug companies should respond." Harriet Hall expressed concerns that patients may not completely comprehend the risks involved in taking medications available under the right-to-try law, nor understand the low probability of success, especially patients who were not healthy enough to qualify to participate in clinical trials. She states these patients may have other medical conditions that could make them more vulnerable to complications from experimental treatments.

== Further developments ==
When Trump signed the legislation into law in May 2018 he said, "We will be saving—I don't even want to say thousands, because I think it's going to be much more. Thousands and thousands. Hundreds of thousands. We're going to be saving tremendous numbers of lives." As of June 2019 only two patients have received access to experimental medical products through the federal right to try pathway. In February 2019, one of the namesakes of the federal law, Matt Bellina, who has ALS, said that he gained access to an experimental treatment through the drug company Brainstorm. Brainstorm said it would not accept any other patients for trials. Frank Mongiello, who also has ALS, still has not found access to a treatment program. In an interview his wife said, "We had a lot of hope that if the right to try was passed it would give an incentive for the drug companies to make available the drugs. But now it doesn't seem as though the drug companies are giving away their drugs either."

Natalie Harp, who was invited onto the stage by President Trump while he was speaking in June 2019, at a Faith and Freedom Coalition conference, a coalition of conservative evangelical Christians, said that the legislation saved her life. Harp, who states she was diagnosed with Stage 2 cancer and left housebound by a medical error one year after the bill passed, declared the legislation saved her life and she praised the Trump administration's fight for healthcare. Harp's claims were called into question by former FDA official Peter Lurie and Simon Fraser University professor of health sciences Jeremy Snyder. Snyder noted that Harp had been given "an FDA-approved immunotherapy drug for an unapproved use", which had been allowed prior to Right to Try.

The federal Right to Try law requires that sponsors report an annual summary to the FDA of uses, including serious adverse events, number of doses used, number of patients dosed, and the intended use of the product. A proposed guidance document for the reporting requirements was released in 2020; the final guidance has not been released. Until that guidance is released, the usage of right to try will be uncertain. According to available records, very few patients accessed unapproved medical products through Right to Try until recently. In February 2021, NeuroRX CEO Jonathan Javitt gave an interview indicating that its drug, aviptadil, had been used in over 500 patients with COVID-19, after the phase IIb/III trial failed to show significant benefit. FDA rejected the application for Emergency Use Authorization, prompting Javitt and NeuroRX to allow use of aviptadil as a possible "hail mary" drug for severely ill COVID-19 patients.

== See also ==
- Expanded access
- Psilocybin decriminalization in the United States
