= Washington Legal Foundation =

Non-profit organization in the USA

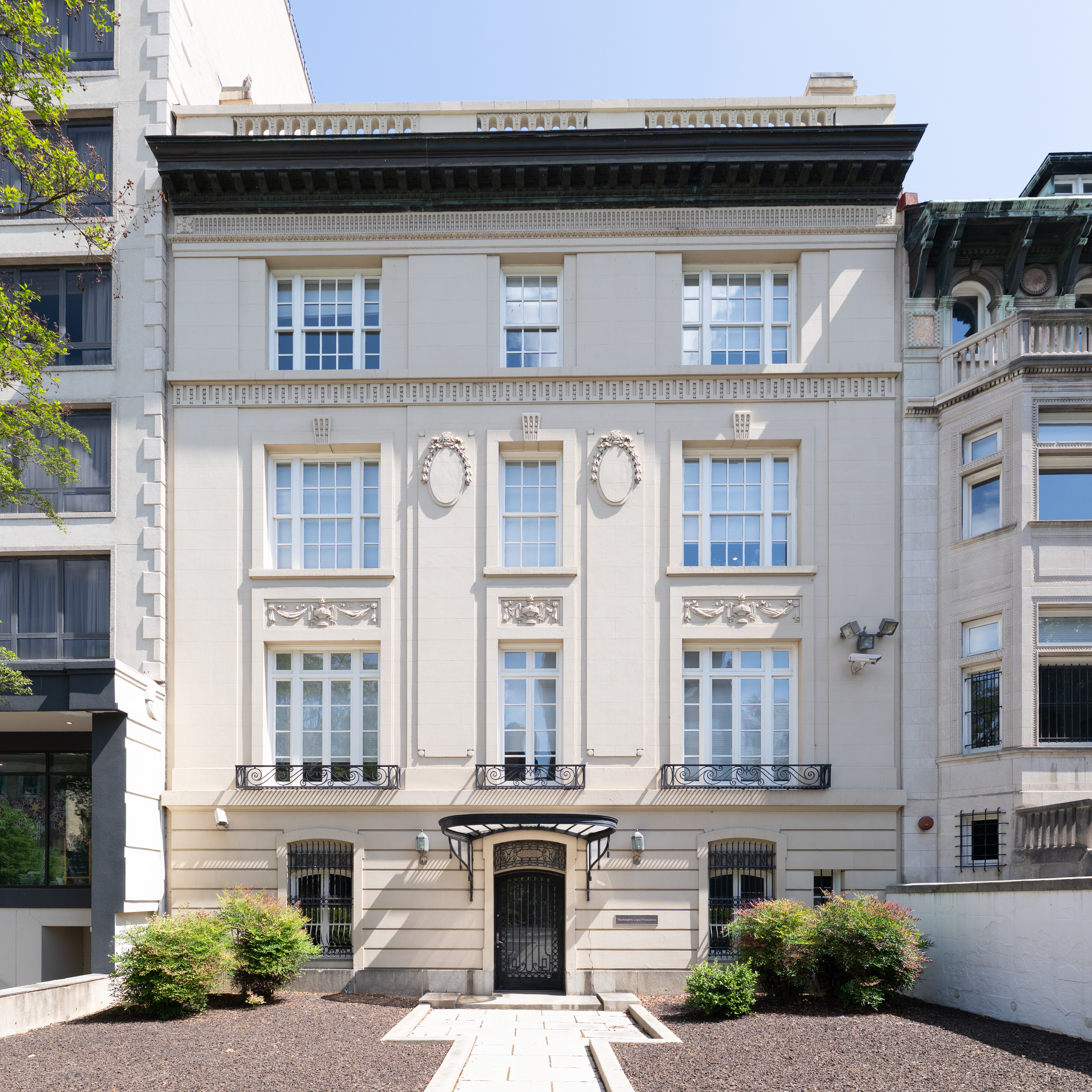
The Washington, D.C. headquarters in 2026

The Washington Legal Foundation (WLF) is a non-profit legal organization located at 2007-2009 Massachusetts Avenue NW, on Embassy Row in Washington, D.C. Founded in 1977, the Foundation's stated goal is "to defend and promote the principles of freedom and justice." The organization promotes pro-business and free-market positions and is widely perceived as conservative.

WLF addresses a range of legal matters, including commercial free speech, corporate criminal liability, environmental regulation, food and drug law, health care, and intellectual property through three primary functions. Its first functions as a public interest law firm that brings original lawsuits, files amicus briefs, intervenes in court cases, and petitions agencies for rulings. It also works as a legal think tank that publishes in seven different formats once every two weeks, and it is a non-profit communications company that hosts regular conferences, media briefings, and national educational advertising campaigns.

== Litigation ==
Since its founding in 1977, the Washington Legal Foundation has litigated more than 1600 court cases, participated in nearly 900 administrative and regulatory proceedings, and published nearly 2,900 legal studies by over 2,500 different legal experts. They have also initiated 138 judicial misconduct investigations, and filed more than 165 attorney and reform actions and petitions.

Cases in which WLF have been involved include:

Abigail Alliance v. von Eschenbach, 495 F.3d 695 (D.C. Cir. 2007). WLF represented terminally ill plaintiffs who unsuccessfully sued the Food and Drug Administration (FDA) for potentially life-saving drugs that had not yet been approved.

Auvil v. CBS "60 Minutes", 67 F.3d 816 (9th Cir. 1995). The appellate court affirmed the trial court's rejection of a challenge to evidence which supported a 60 Minutes broadcast alleging that the Washington apples contained a carcinogen that harms children.

Goldwater v. Carter, 617 F.2d 697 (D.C. Cir. 1979). WLF represented several members of congress who enjoined President Jimmy Carter from unilaterally terminating the Mutual Defense Treaty between the U.S. and Taiwan without the support of a majority of both houses of Congress, or two-thirds of the Senate. The Supreme Court later overruled this decision.

Phillips v. Washington Legal Foundation, 524 U.S. 156 (1998). This case determined that interest earned on a fund belongs to the person who owns the principal. The government’s effort to seize the funds in question was unconstitutional under the takings clause of the Fifth Amendment as applied through the 14th Amendment.

Washington Legal Foundation v. Henney, 202 F.3d 331 (D.C. Cir. 2000). This lawsuit forced the government to admit that neither the FDAMA nor the CME Guidance independently authorizes the FDA to prohibit or sanction drug manufacturers from discussing off-label uses for their drugs.

Washington Legal Foundation v. U.S. Department of Justice, 491 U.S. 440 (1989). This case held that the Federal Advisory Committee Act did not apply to U.S. Justice Department's solicitation of the American Bar Association’s views on prospective judicial nominees.

Washington Legal Foundation v. Shalala, U.S. Dist. Lexis 9377 (1993). The court dismissed the complaint for lack of standing when WLF sued on behalf of a cardiac surgeon and two human heart valve recipients to enjoin the United States Department of Health and Human Services and the FDA from enforcing regulatory restrictions that would subject human-tissue heart valves to FDA's premarket approval process.

=== Amicus curiae ===
In Holder v. Humanitarian Law Project, the Washington Legal Foundation filed a brief that argued that certain provisions of the PATRIOT Act do not violate the First Amendment. The statute makes it a crime to give any form of aid, including humanitarian assistance, to groups on the U.S. State Department’s list of foreign terrorist organizations.

== "In All Fairness" ==
WLF regularly publishes an advertisement, "In All Fairness" in the national edition of The New York Times in which the organization presents its point of view on an issue.

== Partnerships ==
WLF regularly partners with Washington-based think tanks such as the American Enterprise Institute, the Brookings Institution, the Cato Institute, and The Heritage Foundation.
