= Elizabeth Wilkins =

American lawyer and government official

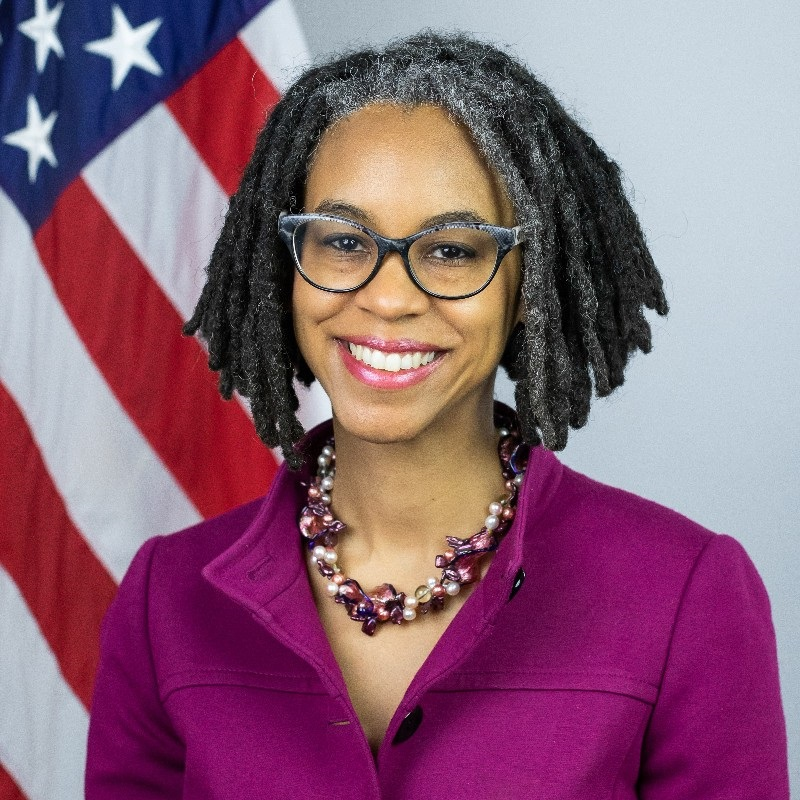
- Official portrait, 2021
- Born: Elizabeth Wood Claytor Wilkins; 1982 or 1983 (age 43–44)
- Education: Yale University (BA, JD)
- Occupations: Lawyer; Government official
- Political party: Democratic
- Parents: Patricia A. King; Roger Wilkins

Elizabeth Wood Claytor Wilkins (born 1982 or 1983) is an American lawyer who serves as President and CEO of the Roosevelt Institute. She served previously as director of the office of policy planning at the Federal Trade Commission. From 2021 to 2022, she was Senior Advisor to Ron Klain, the White House chief of staff under President Joe Biden from 2021 to 2023.

== Early life and education ==
Wilkins grew up in Southwest DC. She is the daughter of Patricia A. King, a law professor at Georgetown, and Roger Wilkins, a history professor at George Mason University. He was a member of the group at The Washington Post that received a 1972 Pulitzer Prize for reporting on Watergate. Her great uncle is Roy Wilkins, the civil rights figure and leader of the NAACP.

Wilkins graduated from Sidwell Friends School, which was followed by an undergraduate degree from Yale University. Later, she attended Yale Law School, where she received a Juris Doctor degree in 2013.

== Career ==
After earning her undergraduate degree, Wilkins worked for the Service Employees International Union where she focused in labor policy. She also did some work towards assisting tenants' organizations in The Bronx.

She then worked for the Barack Obama 2008 presidential campaign, moving to Chicago where the campaign was based. She served multiple roles there including as a state field director for Michigan. As such, she was the only black woman to serve as a director for a battleground state.

From 2009 to 2010, she was an urban policy and economic opportunity adviser in the White House Domestic Policy Council. In that capacity, she worked for Melody Barnes, the director of the council.

After law school, she was a law clerk to Chief Judge Merrick B. Garland of the United States Court of Appeals for the District of Columbia Circuit from 2013 to 2014, and then for Associate Justice Elena Kagan at the United States Supreme Court from 2014 to 2015. In 2015, she worked for Karl Racine, the Attorney General for the District of Columbia, where she assisted in starting a public-advocacy division at the office.

She joined the senior leadership team of the Biden transition in the summer of 2020 working with the domestic and economic policy teams.

From 2021 to 2022, she was Senior Advisor to Ron Klain, the White House chief of staff under President Joe Biden- from 2021 to 2023. In February 2022, she became the director of the office of policy planning at the Federal Trade Commission. She picked that position because she thought the agency, as led by its new chair Lina Khan, would be a promising place at which to deal with economic injustice. In her role she leads inquiries into such issues as antitrust, prescription-drug prices, and the baby-formula shortage. She has said that in her work she desires to "make people think twice about setting up a whole business model that is premised on extraction and exploitation" and to make "the government sensitive to the needs and wants of ordinary people."

In December 2024, the Roosevelt Institute announced that Wilkins will join its leadership team as CEO in February 2025.

== Personal life ==
In 2013, she married Graham Lake, a lawyer. They have known each other since kindergarten.
