= Repugnancy costs =

Repugnancy costs are costs borne by an individual or entity as a result of a stimulus that goes against that individual or entity's cultural mores. The cost could be emotional, physical, mental or figurative. The stimulus could be anything from food to people to an idea.

These costs are perspective-dependent and individual. They may be different for different groups of people; countries, states, ethnicities, etc. The term allows for a clear and understandable way of representing the concept of contextual stigma in a literal and applicable sense.

Repugnancy costs measure the degree of dislike toward a repugnant market or transaction by appealing to the concept of equalizing differences developed by Adam Smith: "What is the minimum compensation that we have to provide to an individual to be willing to allow a repugnant market or transaction?"

== Origin ==
Repugnancy costs were first mentioned in a debate between Alvin Roth and Julio Elias on whether there should be an official market for kidneys. The act of buying and selling organs may be against one's cultural mores; it may be repugnant. Hence, this is an additional cost one must bear if such a market was deemed repugnant in the context of one's culture.

In an experimental survey, Elias, Lacetera and Macis (2019) find that preferences for compensation have strong moral foundations; participants in the experiment especially reject direct payments by patients, which they find would violate principles of fairness.

== See also ==
- Prohibitionism
- Repugnant market
- Yuck factor
