= Harvey Oxenhorn =

American writer

Harvey Oxenhorn (1952 – May 16, 1990) was an American academic and author most famous for writing the book, Tuning the Rig. He was the Director of the Public Policy Communications Program at Harvard University. Oxenhorn was born in New York City. He got a Bachelor of Arts degree at Swarthmore College and a Doctorate in English from Stanford University. His thesis was entitled "Elemental Things: The Poetry of Hugh MacDiarmid". He taught at both Stanford and Tufts University before accepting a position at Harvard, first as an instructor, and then as Director in 1983. In addition to nonfiction, he also wrote poetry. His work has been included in such publications as The Atlantic, Ploughshares, and The Southern Review. He spent a considerable amount of time in writer's retreats such as the MacDowell Colony and Yaddo.

Tuning the Rig, a nonfiction account of Oxenhorn's time at sea on a scientific whaling expedition, was reviewed favorably in many newspapers, including in the Toronto Star, the New York Times, and the Ottawa Citizen. His doctoral thesis was also turned into a book, receiving positive reviews. Oxenhorn was in the process of writing a book about his experiences with teaching children in Kenya at the Yaddo retreat when he died in a car crash in Hillside, New York. His funeral service was held at the Essex Shipbuilding Museum. Oxenhorn's friend, the writer Alice Hoffman, successfully lobbied Zoland Books to republish Tuning the Rig. This latest edition includes an afterword by the Poet Laureate Robert Pinsky. He was the son of the educator and author Joseph Oxenhorn and the brother of the translator and political theorist Mera J. Flaumenhaft.
