= President's Council on Bioethics =

Advisory council to US President George W. Bush

The President's Council on Bioethics (PCBE) was a group of individuals appointed by United States President George W. Bush to advise his administration on bioethics. Established on November 28, 2001, by Executive Order 13237, the council was directed to "advise the President on bioethical issues that may emerge as a consequence of advances in biomedical science and technology". It succeeded and largely replaced the National Bioethics Advisory Commission, appointed by President Bill Clinton in 1996, which expired in 2001.

The members of the council were appointed directly by the President; the President also chose the chairperson of the council (last appointed Chair was Edmund D. Pellegrino). Council members, totaling no more than 18, were appointed for a two-year term, after which time they could be reappointed by the President. Individuals appointed could not be officers or employees of the federal government. Executive Order 13237 was renewed in 2003, 2005 and again in 2007.

== Expiration and replacement ==
In June 2009, President Barack Obama's administration informed members of the council that their services were no longer needed. Through a spokesperson, Obama made clear that he intended to replace the committee with a body that "offers practical policy options" rather than philosophical guidance.

Executive Order 13521 of November 24, 2009, superseded the previous council by establishing the Presidential Commission for the Study of Bioethical Issues. On November 25, 2009, Obama named Amy Gutmann, the president of the University of Pennsylvania, to chair his new advisory panel on bioethics. James W. Wagner, the president of Emory University, was appointed vice chairperson.

== Criticism ==
Critics have questioned the motives and goals of the PCBE. Elizabeth Blackburn, who was dismissed from the Commission, co-authored an article, citing examples published by other members, suggesting that it was set up to justify President Bush's positions on stem cell research and abortion, writing "...our concern is that some of their contents... may have ended up distorting the potential of biomedical research and the motivation of some of its researchers."

Bioethicist Leslie A. Meltzer accused the council of wrapping "political and religious agendas in the guise of dignity," and described them as largely Christian-affiliated neoconservatives; philosophers and political scientists rather than bench scientists. Meltzer said that Council members mischaracterized the positions of their opponents and used invective rather than addressing the merits of the arguments.

The response to President Obama's decision to disband the council drew both criticism and praise. Colleen Carroll Campbell, a former speechwriter for President Bush and a member of the conservative advocacy group Ethics and Public Policy Center predicted that "Obama's desire to see his policies backed by expert 'consensus' more likely will be realized with a new commission composed of like-minded political liberals steeped in utilitarianism than with the brainy, diverse and unpredictable crew that populated the now-defunct council." In contrast, Jacob M. Appel of New York's Mount Sinai Hospital wrote that "the panel itself, far from being an incubator of intellectual ferment, had evolved into a publicly funded right-wing think tank with a handful of token moderates for window dressing" and argued that "Obama was wise to scrap the entire panel and to start over."

== Members and staff ==
=== Chairmen ===
- Edmund D. Pellegrino - chairman (2005–2008)
- Leon R. Kass - chairman (2001–2005)

=== Members ===
- Ben Carson
- Rebecca S. Dresser
- Daniel W. Foster
- Michael S. Gazzaniga
- Robert P. George
- Alfonso Gomez-Lobo
- Leon R. Kass
- William B. Hurlbut
- Charles Krauthammer
- Peter Augustine Lawler
- Paul McHugh
- Gilbert Meilaender
- Janet D. Rowley
- Diana J. Schaub
- Elizabeth H. Blackburn (2002–2004)
- Stephen L. Carter (2002)
- Francis Fukuyama (2002–2005)
- Mary Ann Glendon (2002–2005)
- William F. May (2002–2004)
- Michael J. Sandel (2002–2005)
- James Q. Wilson (2002–2005)

=== Council staff ===
- F. Daniel Davis - executive director (2005–2009)
- Yuval Levin - executive director (2004–2005)
- Dean Frazier Clancy - executive director (2001–2004)
- O. Carter Snead - general counsel (2003–2005)
- Richard Roblin - scientific director (2001–2005), acting executive director (2005)

== Reports and publications ==
- Taking Care: Ethical Caregiving in Our Aging Society (2005)
- White Paper: Alternative Sources of Human Pluripotent Stem Cells (2005)
- Reproduction and Responsibility: The Regulation of New Biotechnologies (2004)
- Monitoring Stem Cell Research (2004)
- Being Human: Readings from the President's Council on Bioethics (2003)
- Beyond Therapy: Biotechnology and the Pursuit of Happiness (2003)
- Human Cloning and Human Dignity (2002)

== See also ==
- Bioethics
- Biotechnology
- Cloning
- Comité consultatif national d'éthique, a French governmental advisory council on bioethics issues created by François Mitterrand in 1983
- Eugenics
- President's Commission for the Study of Ethical Problems in Medicine and Biomedical and Behavioral Research (U.S. 1978)
- Stem-cell research
