= Alfonso Gómez-Lobo =

Alfonso Gómez-Lobo (January 1, 1940 – December 31, 2011) was a professor of metaphysics and moral philosophy at Georgetown University known for his critical evaluations of modern-day ethics. He was a member of The President's Council on Bioethics of the United States.

Born in Viña del Mar, Chile in 1940, Gomez-Lobo studied at the Pontifical Catholic University of Valparaiso, the University of Athens in Greece and three German universities: the University of Tübingen, LMU Munich, and Heidelberg University. He completed his PhD in Munich in Philosophy, Classic and Ancient History in 1966, graduating magna cum laude. He then went on to teach at universities in Valparaiso, Puerto Rico, and finally at Penn State before joining with Georgetown University in 1977.

He has received a number of awards and several research fellowships, including one from the Guggenheim Foundation. His work translating Ancient Greek texts into Spanish has also received considerable attention.
