= Mario García Palmieri =

Puerto Rican politician and cardiologist (1927–2014)

- Born: Mario Rubén García Palmieri; August 2, 1927; Adjuntas, Puerto Rico
- Died: September 16, 2014; Guaynabo, Puerto Rico
- Education: University of Maryland School of Medicine (M.D.)
- Occupation: Cardiologist

Notes
- García Palmieri is the first Hispanic to have the distinction of being designated a "Master" by the American College of Cardiology

Mario Rubén García Palmieri (August 2, 1927 – September 16, 2014) was a cardiologist and the first Hispanic to have the distinction of being designated a "Master" by the American College of Cardiology (MACC) in recognition of his contributions to the field of cardiology. Among the many societies to which he belonged are the Puerto Rican Society of Cardiology and the PR Medical Association.

== Early years ==
García Palmieri was born in the town of Adjuntas, Puerto Rico, and received his secondary education in the town of Aguadilla. He was accepted by the University of Puerto Rico where he earned his Bachelor in Science degree. His family was very humble and could not afford to pay for his continued education. However, because of his grades, García Palmieri was the received an academic scholarship to the University of Puerto Rico. He graduated from the Magna Cum Laude from UPR in 1949. He was then accepted into the University of Maryland School of Medicine, and earned his medical degree in 1951.

García Palmieri returned to Puerto Rico where he completed his residency. He was trained by renown cardiologist Dr. Rurico Diaz Rivera at the School of Medicine at the University of Puerto Rico, where he completed his professional training in internal medicine and cardiology.

García Palmieri was the first cardiologist to be trained in Puerto Rico.

== School of Medicine at the University of Puerto Rico ==
In 1960, García Palmieri was named director of internal medicine of the School of Medicine at the University of Puerto Rico (RCM), a position which he held until 1995, and in 1961 director of the institution's cardiology program. During this period (1966–67), he was named by Roberto Sánchez Vilella, the governor of Puerto Rico, Puerto Rico's Secretary of Health. He resigned from the position because of health problems and returned to the RCM.

García Palmieri has published 178 medicine articles, 6 books, and more than 80 newspaper columns geared to orient the people concerning medical problems. He participated in two presidential medical commissions, one under the presidency of Richard Nixon and the other under the presidency of Jimmy Carter (President's Commission for the Study of Ethical Problems in Medicine and Biomedical and Behavioral Research). The commissions published nine books on their investigations of which five were co-authored by Garcia Palmieri.

== Memberships ==
García Palmieri held Fellowships in the Royal Society of Health, the American College of Chest Physicians, the European Society of Cardiology, and the American Heart Association. He is also the only person to serve twice as president of the International Society of Cardiology. In 1956 he was president of Phi Sigma Alpha fraternity.

== Honors ==
García Palmieri was the first person on whom the University of Puerto Rico bestowed the title of Distinguished Professor. In 1980, he received the International Achievement Award of the American Heart Association. His many honors include the title of Master of the College of Physicians (1984), and the Honor and Gold Key Award (1989) for most distinguished alumnus in the University of Maryland. In 1996, the University of Puerto Rico established the Mario Garcia Palmieri endowed chair, and the main bi-annual lecture of the Interamerican Congress of Cardiology bears his name.

In 2001, he was awarded the ACP Laureate Award. The award honors those members of the ACP in Puerto Rico who have demonstrated, by their example and conduct, an abiding commitment to excellence in medical care, education or research, and in service to their community and the ACP. Recipients of the award bear the title "Laureate of the Puerto Rico Chapter." He has the distinction of being the first Hispanic designated a "Master" by the American College of Cardiology.

The cardiologists achieving highest distinction in the field are awarded the title Master of the American College of Cardiology (M.A.C.C.). This honor is bestowed upon a maximum of three cardiologists in practice each year. He has also been decorated by the governments of the Dominican Republic, Venezuela and Spain. In 1999 he was given the Medalla de Honor of Fi Sigma Alfa Fraternity.

== Written works ==
Among his written works are the following:

- Lo Que Debes Saber Sobre Tu Salud; Publisher: La Editorial Universidad de Puerto Rico (January 1, 2000); ISBN 978-0-8477-0107-0
- The Electrocardiogram and Vectorcardiogram in Congenital Heart Disease; Publisher: Grune & Stratton (1965); ASIN B000IRBWY8
- The International Society and Federation of Cardiology and its components: historical data, 1950–1990, M.R. Garcia-Palmieri, 1990
- Historia Grafica De La Sociedad Interamericana De Cardiologia 1944–1999 Publisher s.n.; ISBN 0-9650108-0-5/ISBN 978-0-9650108-0-1/ISBN 0-9650108-0-5

== See also ==
- List of Puerto Ricans
- Puerto Rican scientists and inventors
