= Amy Kass =

American scholar and academic (1940–2015)

Amy Judith Kass (née Apfel; September 17, 1940 – August 19, 2015) was an American academic and a senior fellow at the Hudson Institute. She spent most of her career as a professor of classic texts in the College of the University of Chicago.

Her scholarly interests included courtship, marriage, citizenship and philanthropy. Her books include Giving Well, Doing Good: Readings for Thoughtful Philanthropists, Wing to Wing, Oar to Oar: Readings on Courting and Marrying, and What So Proudly We Hail: America’s Soul in Story, Speech, and Song.

== Career ==
The New York City-raised Apfel received her B.A. from the University of Chicago, and her M.A. from Brandeis University. In 1973, she earned her PhD from Johns Hopkins University.

In the mid 1960s, she began teaching high school history in Lincoln-Sudbury, Massachusetts. During the summer of 1965, she and her husband, Leon Kass, spent a month in Holmes County, Mississippi to work for civil rights. Working with the Medical Community for Human Rights and the Mississippi Freedom Democratic Party (MFDP), the Kasses "lived with a farmer couple in the Mount Olive community, in a house with no telephone, hot water, or indoor toilet. They visited families in the community, participated in their activities, and helped with voter registration and other efforts to encourage the people to organize themselves in defense of their rights".

Later that fall, Leon Kass wrote a letter to his family and friends detailing the couple's experiences and appealing to them to donate to the Civil Rights Movement.

== Education and career ==
Amy Apfel was educated in the College of the University of Chicago, and then earned a Master's Degree at Brandeis University, and a PhD in the history of education at Johns Hopkins University. She began her teaching career at Lincoln-Sudbury Regional High School in Sudbury, Massachusetts.

Her professorial teaching career began at Georgetown University in 1969, where she taught at the Institute for Adult Education. She then taught at Johns Hopkins University and St. John's College, Annapolis in the 1970s. Her career at the University of Chicago started in 1976 when she was appointed Lecturer in the Humanities Collegiate Division.

In 1977, Leon and Amy Kass founded the "Human Being and Citizen" common core course at Chicago. She was founding director of the "Tocqueville Seminars on Civic Leadership" at the University of Chicago.

She later served on the National Council of the National Endowment for the Humanities, as well as on the Council of Scholars of the American Academy of Liberal Education, and as a consultant on American history and civic education at the Corporation for Public Broadcasting. In 2005-06, she organized a lecture series at the Hudson Institute called Dialogues on Civic Philanthropy.

== Publications ==
Kass authored numerous articles and edited five books, including the reader Giving Well, Doing Good: Readings for Thoughtful Philanthropists. She compiled courtship stories she co-edited with her husband, Leon Kass, Wing to Wing, Oar to Oar: Readings on Courting and Marrying.

In 2011, Kass co-edited the book, What So Proudly We Hail: America's Soul in Story, Speech, and Song with her husband, and Diana Schaub. The book is a compilation of short readings on areas of American identity, character, and civic life. She also wrote articles on the themes of patriotism and civic duty for both the National Review, and The Weekly Standard.

== Death ==
Amy Judith Kass died of complications of leukemia and ovarian cancer at her home in Washington, D.C., aged 74. She was survived by her husband (Leon R. Kass) and their two daughters, their four granddaughters, and her three siblings.

== Awards and honors ==
Kass received the Llewellyn John and Harriet Manchester Quantrell Award for Excellence in Undergraduate Teaching from the University of Chicago in 1980. She was the recipient of the Florence Bamberger Award from Johns Hopkins University.

The Amy Kass, AB '62 Award is established in 2016 by the University of Chicago's New Collegiate Division, awarded annually to a student in the Fundamentals: Issues and Texts for the best thesis.

== Selected bibliography ==
Books

- Amy A. Kass and Leon R. Kass, eds. The Meaning of Martin Luther King Jr. Day. What So Proudly We Hail, 2013.
- What So Proudly We Hail: America's Soul in Story, Speech, and Song. Ed. Amy A. Kass, Leon R. Kass, and Diana J. Schaub. N.p.: Intercollegiate Studies Institute, 2011. (ISBN 1610170067)
- Kass, Amy A. Giving Well, Doing Good: Readings for Thoughtful Philanthropists. Bloomington: Indiana University Press, 2007. (ISBN 0253350484)
- Kass, Amy A. The Perfect Gift: The Philanthropic Imagination in Poetry and Prose. Bloomington: Indiana University Press, 2002. (ISBN 0253215420)
- Wing to Wing, Oar to Oar: Readings on Courting and Marrying. Ed. Amy A. Kass and Leon R. Kass. N.p.: University of Notre Dame Press, 1999. (ISBN 0268019606)
- Kass, Amy A. American Lives: Cultural Differences, Individual Distinction : An Anthology of American Autobiography. N.p.: Golden Owl Publishing Company, 1995. (ISBN 1566960932)

Selected articles

- "The Liberal Arts Movement: From Ideas to Practice," in The College, XXV, October, 1973, pp. 1–8, 25–26
- "Autobiographers as Teachers: Toward Solving the Problem of Civic Education," in Philip Jackson and Sophie Haroutunian-Gordon, editors, From Socrates to Software: The Teacher as Text and the Text as Teacher, Eighty-ninth Yearbook of the National Society for the Study of Education, Chicago, 1989, pp. 90–114.
- "The Education of Telemachos," in St. John's Review, XLI, number 1, 1991–1992, pp. 39–60.
- "The Giving Tree : A Symposium," in First Things, January, 1995, pp. 36–37.
- "Who Am I?: Autobiography and American Identity," in College Teaching, Fall, 1995, pp. 93–99.
- [with Leon R. Kass] "What's Your Name?", in First Things, November, 1995, pp. 14–25
- [with Leon R. Kass] "Proposing Courtship," in First Things, October, 1999, pp. 32–41
