= Roger Wilkins =

American lawyer, historian, journalist (1932–2017)

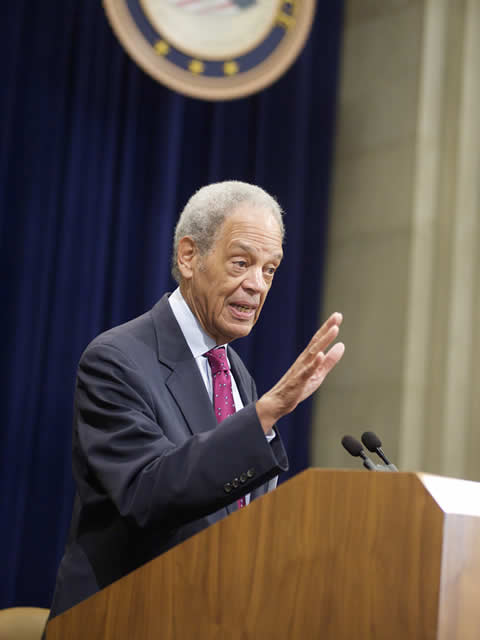
- Wilkins in 2009

15th United States Assistant Attorney General
- In office 1966–1969
- President: Lyndon B. Johnson
- Preceded by: Mabel Walker Willebrandt (1929)
- Succeeded by: Wesley Pomeroy

Personal details
- Born: January 29, 1932 Kansas City, Missouri, U.S.
- Died: March 26, 2017 (aged 85) Kensington, Maryland, U.S.
- Cause of death: Complications from dementia
- Party: Democratic Party
- Spouse(s): Eve Wilkins, Patricia A. King
- Children: Amy Wilkins, David Wilkins, Elizabeth Wilkins
- Education: University of Michigan (A.B., J.D.)
- Occupation: Lawyer; civil rights activist; professor; historian; journalist

Roger Wood Wilkins (January 29, 1932 – March 26, 2017) was an American lawyer, civil rights leader, professor of history, and journalist who served as the 15th United States Assistant Attorney General under President Lyndon B. Johnson from 1966 to 1969.

A member of the Democratic Party, Wilkins was mentored by Supreme Court of the United States Associate Justice Thurgood Marshall early in his career. Throughout the 1960s, Wilkins campaigned for the passage of the Civil Rights Act of 1964 and the Voting Rights Act of 1965. In 1965, President Lyndon B. Johnson appointed Wilkins to be the administration's chief troubleshooter on urban racial issues; he later became assistant attorney general in the Johnson administration.

Wilkins' uncle, Roy Wilkins, was the former executive director of the National Association for the Advancement of Colored People (NAACP) from 1964 to 1977.

== Biography ==
Wilkins was born in Kansas City, Missouri, on January 29, 1932, and grew up in Michigan. He was educated at Crispus Attucks Elementary School in Kansas City and Creston High School in Grand Rapids, Michigan. Wilkins received his A.B. degree in 1953 and J.D. degree in 1956, both from the University of Michigan, where he interned with the NAACP and was a member of the senior leadership society, Michigamua.

=== Career ===
Wilkins worked as a welfare lawyer in Ohio before becoming an Assistant Attorney General in President Lyndon B. Johnson's administration at the age of 33; in this capacity, he was one of the highest-ranking Black Americans ever to serve in the executive branch up to that time.

Wilkins was sworn in as Director of the federal Community Relations Service on Friday, February 4, 1966, in a ceremony at the White House.

Leaving government in 1969 at the end of the Johnson administration, he worked briefly for the Ford Foundation before joining the opinion section of The Washington Post as an editorial board member. Alongside additional news reports by Bob Woodward, Carl Bernstein and E. J. Bachinski and editorial cartoons by Herblock, print editorials by Wilkins and Philip L. Geyelin were included as supplemental items in the publication's 1973 Pulitzer Prize for Public Service-winning entry on the incipient Watergate scandal, reifying its importance in the popular consciousness and ultimately precipitating President Richard Nixon's resignation from office.

Wilkins left The Washington Post in 1974 to work for The New York Times as an editorial board member and opinion columnist. In 1977, he joined other journalists of color in a lawsuit alleging that the newspaper employed racial discrimination in hiring and promotions. Although the litigation resulted in a cash settlement and the facilitation of improvements, he left the newspaper in 1979 to become an associate editor and columnist at The Washington Star in 1980–81. In 1980, he became a radio news commentator for National Public Radio (NPR). Beginning in 1982, Wilkins was a senior fellow at the Institute for Policy Studies.

Wilkins and fellow Black journalist William Raspberry were appointed concurrently as the first non-White members of the Pulitzer Prize Board in 1979; in this capacity, Wilkins served on an advisory panel that recommended the forfeiture of Janet Cooke's Pulitzer Prize for Feature Writing and as the Columbia University-based committee's chairperson during the 1987–88 academic year, after having initially argued in favor of Cooke's award.

Wilkins was the Robinson Professor of History and American Culture at George Mason University in Fairfax, Virginia, from 1988 until his retirement in 2007, becoming one of the most eminent faculty members at the incipient institution. He also retained his position at the Institute for Policy Studies until 1992. Wilkins was also the publisher of the NAACP's journal, The Crisis.

Wilkins resided in Washington, D.C., and was married to Patricia King, a legal scholar at Georgetown University.

Wilkins died on March 26, 2017, in Kensington, Maryland, from complications of dementia. He was 85.

== Bibliography ==
- A Man's Life: An Autobiography. 1982, reprinted 1991. New York: Simon & Schuster. ISBN 0-671-22673-8.
- Quiet Riots: Race and Poverty in the United States. Edited by Wilkins and Fred Harris. 1998. New York: Pantheon Books. ISBN 0-679-72100-2.
- Jefferson's Pillow: The Founding Fathers and the Dilemma of Black Patriotism. 2001. Boston: Beacon Press. ISBN 0-8070-0956-3.
