= Patricia A. King =

American legal and public health academic

Patricia Ann King
- Born: June 12, 1942 (age 83); Norfolk, Virginia, U.S.
- Education: Wheaton College (BA); Harvard University (JD)
- Occupation: Professor of law emeritus
- Employer: Georgetown University Law Center
- Known for: First African-American tenured Professor of Law at Georgetown University Law Center, Bioethics and the law
- Movement: Civil Rights
- Board member of: National Academies of Science Board on Health Sciences Policy, Harvard Corporation (2006 – 2012)
- Spouse: Roger Wilkins
- Children: Elizabeth Wilkins

Patricia A. King (born June 12, 1942) is an American lawyer, educator and civil rights activist who is a professor of law emeritus at Georgetown University Law Center and an adjunct professor in the School of Hygiene and Public Health at Johns Hopkins University. Her expertise lies at the intersection of law, medicine, ethics, and public policy. In 1979, she became the first African-American woman law professor to receive tenure at Georgetown.

== Early life and education ==
King grew up in the Roberts Park and later Liberty Park public housing developments in segregated Norfolk, Virginia. Her mother, Grayce King, worked as a secretary and her father, Addison King, was a newspaperman, working first for the Norfolk Journal and Guide and later for the Pittsburgh Courier. She and her sister were raised mostly by her mother, as her father remained in a sanitorium being treated for tuberculosis for much of her childhood and teenage years. She has cited her early life experience with Norfolk's mixed-race health clinics as a source of her interest in race, medicine, and equity, recalling the indignity with which she was treated during routine doctor's visits.

In 1959, King graduated as the valedictorian of her class at the segregated Booker T. Washington High School. That same year, schools in Norfolk became integrated under a court order. She then attended Wheaton College in Massachusetts on a scholarship. Her high school physics teacher helped her navigate the admissions process, paying for her SAT registration and putting her in touch with the National Scholarship Service and Fund for Negro Students. She was only able to afford the application fee for one college, so after much deliberation, chose Wheaton.

Away from her family and in a new setting, King struggled through her first year at Wheaton, ultimately losing her scholarship. Her family worked to support her financially until she turned her grades around, with her uncle taking out a second mortgage on his home and her mother providing emotional support. King eventually secured another scholarship and graduated with honors in 1963 with a Bachelor of Arts in Religion and Philosophy. During her time at Wheaton, she also served as the president of the College Government Association and Wheaton now recognizes a freshman or sophomore who has shown progress in developing their leadership skills with the Patricia King Leadership Award.

In 1966, King attended Harvard Law School, where she received her Juris Doctor degree in 1969. During that time, she worked as an administrative intern and budget analyst at the United States Department of State. She was admitted to practice in the District of Columbia Bar on November 4, 1969, and was later admitted to practice by the Supreme Court of the United States on June 30, 1980.

== Career ==
King began her career working in civil rights. From August 1969 to October 1971, she served as the Special Assistant to the Chairman of the Equal Employment Opportunity Commission. She also served as a Deputy Assistant Attorney General in the Civil Division of the Department of Justice.

In 1974, King joined the Georgetown University Law Center Faculty of Law and in 1979, she became the first African-American woman law professor to receive tenure at Georgetown. There, she worked on legal and policy issues surrounding a range of topics at the intersection of biomedical research and ethics, including informed consent, stem cell research, euthanasia, and genome editing. In this work, she has advocated for the perspective of marginalized communities—including low-income, disabled, and racial and ethnic minority communities—who have an earned mistrust of the biomedical research community. She has also studied and lent her expertise to housing policy and interventions against family violence. In addition to teaching and scholarly research, she served on a number of councils and committees throughout the course of her career.

=== Government service ===
When she was acting director of the Office of Civil Rights at the United States Department of Health, Education and Welfare (now known as the Department of Health and Human Services), she was appointed to serve as a Commissioner on the National Commission for the Protection of Human Subjects of Biomedical and Behavioral Research. The commission was formed after the revelations around the Tuskegee syphilis study and was the first national body working to address biomedical ethics and informed consent. King believed she was chosen to join the commission for her background in civil rights and her participation in the Commission marked the beginning of her career in bioethics and the law. While serving on the commission, she co-authored a number of reports, including the first report on fetal tissue research, as well as the commission's Belmont Report, which was released in 1978 and outlined ethical principles and guidelines for research involving human subjects. In 1980, she was appointed by President Jimmy Carter to the President's Commission for the Study of Ethical Problems in Medicine and Biomedical and Behavioral Research, which was active until 1983.

King's experiences led to her involvement in the National Institutes of Health's (NIH) Recombinant DNA Advisory Committee, where she served from 1979 to 1981. Before joining the committee, she wrote a letter to the Director of the NIH, at his request, suggesting how to gain public trust in deliberations around the potential of recombinant DNA technologies by enhancing transparency and ensuring the committee has appropriate time to digest information before their discussions. In 1989, she was appointed to the Joint Working Group on Ethical, Legal and Social Implications (ELSI) of Human Genome Research, which formed that year to coordinate programs run by the NIH and the U.S. Department of Energy (DOE). The ELSI Working Group issued its first report in January 1990 setting forth a function and purpose for the program to anticipate problems and identify solutions to mapping the human genome. King served on the ELSI group through 1995. In addition, she served on the Advisory Committee to the Director of the National Institutes of Health from 1990 to 1994 during the tenure of Bernadine Healy.

=== Leadership ===
From 2000 to 2005, she chaired Wheaton College's Board. From 2006 to 2012, she served as a member of the President and Fellows of Harvard College (Harvard Corporation), becoming the first African-American woman to serve on the governing board of Harvard University. She has also served as the Vice Chair of the Henry J. Kaiser Family Foundation from 1999 and Vice Chair of the Russell Sage Foundation.

King is an elected member of the American Law Institute and the National Academy of Medicine, as well as a fellow of The Hastings Center, a non-partisan think tank dedicated to bioethics research. She currently serves on the National Academy of Medicine's Standing Committee on Emerging Infectious Diseases and 21st Century Health Threats and Board on Health Sciences Policy. She also served as chair of the academy's Committee on Assessment of Family Violence Interventions.

In 1991, she testified at Clarence Thomas's Supreme Court nomination hearing, citing his opposition to affirmative action, as well as his positions on wage discrimination, class action litigation, and other interventions against gender and racial discrimination, as reason to reject his nomination.

== Selected works ==
- "The Dangers of Difference." Hastings Center Report 22(6):35–38, Nov–Dec 1992 doi:10.2307/3562948
- "The use of race variables in genetic studies of complex traits and the goal of reducing health disparities: a transdisciplinary perspective." American Psychologist, Vol 60(1), Jan 2005, 77–103. https://doi.org/10.1037/0003-066X.60.1.77 [PDF]
- "Race, Equity, Health Policy, and the African American Community" in African American Bioethics: Culture, Race, and Identity 67–92 (Lawrence J. Prograis Jr. & Edmund D. Pellegrino eds., Wash., D.C.: Georgetown University Press 2007).

== Awards and honors ==
- Lifetime Achievement Award, American Society for Bioethics and Humanities, 2022
- Honorary Doctor of Laws, Harvard University, 2014
- Honorary Doctor of Humane Letters, Old Dominion University, 2009
- Sandra Day O'Connor Board Excellence Award, DirectWomen Institute, 2007
- Honorary Doctor of Laws, Wheaton College, 1992
- Elected Member, National Academy of Medicine, 1992
- Secretary's Special Citation, United States Department of Justice, 1973

== Personal life ==
King married Roger Wilkins, an African-American civil rights leader, professor of history, and Pulitzer Prize-winning journalist, in the early 1980s. Together, they have one daughter, Elizabeth Wilkins, who worked on Barack Obama's first campaign for president in 2008.
