= PDC-APB =

Chemical compound

Clinical data
- Other names: 3-Pentadecyl-1,2-phenylene bis(4-(4-aminophenyl)butanoate; Benzenebutanoic acid, 4-amino-, 1,1'-(3-pentadecyl-1,2-phenylene) ester

Identifiers
- IUPAC name: [2-[4-(4-aminophenyl)butanoyloxy]-3-pentadecylphenyl] 4-(4-aminophenyl)butanoate
- CAS Number: 2016046-95-8
- PubChem CID: 89683272
- UNII: LX6RQK5701

Chemical and physical data
- Formula: C_{41}H_{58}N_{2}O_{4}
- Molar mass: 642.925 g·mol^{−1}
- 3D model (JSmol): Interactive image
- SMILES: CCCCCCCCCCCCCCCC1=C(C(=CC=C1)OC(=O)CCCC2=CC=C(C=C2)N)OC(=O)CCCC3=CC=C(C=C3)N
- InChI: InChI=1S/C41H58N2O4/c1-2-3-4-5-6-7-8-9-10-11-12-13-14-20-35-21-17-22-38(46-39(44)23-15-18-33-25-29-36(42)30-26-33)41(35)47-40(45)24-16-19-34-27-31-37(43)32-28-34/h17,21-22,25-32H,2-16,18-20,23-24,42-43H2,1H3; Key:VLRZIRYGLUVGGU-UHFFFAOYSA-N

PDC-APB, or 3-pentadecyl-1,2-phenylene bis(4-(4-aminophenyl)butanoate), is a drug candidate under evaluation to determine if it might protect against contact dermatitis caused by urushiol from poison ivy, poison oak, and poison sumac.

== History ==
The compound is one of a class of compounds developed through University of Mississippi research by Mahmoud ElSohly, Waseem Gul, and Mohammad Khalid Ashfaq. Work on the compound is ongoing under Hapten Sciences, who licensed the university's research in 2010.

== Evaluation as a drug candidate ==
The compound has been evaluated in two Phase I clinical trials, and a third Phase I randomized controlled trial, with a secondary objective of evaluating the effect of treatment on urishiol sensitivity, is due to be completed in December 2022.

== See also ==
- Urushiol-induced contact dermatitis
