= Experimental drug =

Medicine not yet approved for routine use

An experimental drug is a medicinal product (a drug or vaccine) that has not yet received approval from governmental regulatory authorities for routine use in human or veterinary medicine. A medicinal product may be approved for use in one disease or condition but still be considered experimental for other diseases or conditions.

== United States ==
In the United States, the body responsible for approval is the Food and Drug Administration (FDA), which must grant the substance Investigational New Drug (IND) status before it can be tested in human clinical trials. IND status requires the drug's sponsor to submit an IND application that includes data from laboratory and animal testing for safety and efficacy. A drug that is made from a living organism or its products undergoes the same approval process but is called a biologics license application (BLA). Biological drugs include antibodies, interleukins, and vaccines. In 2018 federal "Right to Try" laws were enacted in the United States, which allows individuals who fit into the criteria to try experimental drugs that are not yet deemed safe.

=== Emergency Use Authorization (EUA) ===
The FDA has the authority to issue EUAs for medical products, including drugs and vaccines, during public health emergencies. This mechanism was prominently utilized during the COVID-19 pandemic, allowing for the rapid deployment of vaccines and therapeutics to address the crisis. The process for EUA includes the determination of a public health emergency, review of available scientific evidence, and consideration of the potential benefits and risks of the product.

== Canada ==
In Canada, a Clinical Trial Application (CTA) must be filed with the Health Products and Food Branch (HPFB) of Health Canada before starting a clinical trial. If the clinical trial results show that therapeutic effect of the drug outweighs negative side effects then the sponsor can then to file a New Drug Submission.

== European Union ==
Clinical trials in the European Union (EU) are regulated by the European Medicines Agency (EMA). Beginning in 2019 all applications for clinical trials must use a centralized EU portal and database. All clinical trial results will available to the public with the summary written in layperson's language.

== See also ==
- Off-label treatment
- Lists of investigational drugs
