= Harvey Flaumenhaft =

American writer (born 1938)

Harvey M. Flaumenhaft (born October 18, 1938) is a scholar, sporadic media commentator, a Tutor at and a former Dean of St. John's College. Receiving a Bachelor of Arts degree from the University of Chicago in 1960, Flaumenhaft went on to achieve a Master of Arts degree (1962) and the Ph.D. in political science (1980) also from the University of Chicago. He served as both a Woodrow Wilson and a NASA Fellow. He has held positions as a lecturer at Roosevelt University and the University of Chicago, and as an instructor in government at Wheaton College. He has held his current position at St. John's College since 1968. Flaumenhaft has also served as a visiting professor in the Department of Educational Studies at the University of Delaware.

Flaumenhaft is a respected scholar of the statesman Alexander Hamilton and on the relationship of the sciences and the humanities. His book, The Effective Republic: Administration and Constitution in the Thought of Alexander Hamilton, has been reviewed favorably in a number of publications, and is widely cited in the academic and general literature. He has also appeared on the PBS show Think Tank. He was married to the translator and political theorist Mera J. Flaumenhaft. He has had a long-standing friendship with the scholar Leon Kass.
