= Prohibitionism =

Legal philosophy and political theory

Prohibitionism is a legal philosophy and political theory often used in lobbying which holds that citizens will abstain from actions if the actions are typed as unlawful (i.e. prohibited) and the prohibitions are enforced by law enforcement. This philosophy has been the basis for a number of acts of statutory law throughout history, most notably when a large group of a given population disapproves of and/or feels threatened by an activity in which a smaller group of that population engages, and seeks to render that activity legally prohibited.

== Examples ==
Acts of prohibition have included prohibitions on types of clothing (and prohibitions on lack of clothing), prohibitions on gambling and exotic dancing, the prohibition of drugs (for example, alcohol prohibition and cannabis prohibition), prohibitions on tobacco smoking, and gun prohibition. Indeed, the period of Prohibition in the United States between 1920 and 1933 due to the Eighteenth Amendment and the Volstead Act often is referred to simply as "Prohibition", as is the "war on drugs" that succeeded it.

== Criticism ==
The success of a measure of prohibitionism has been criticized as often depending too much upon effective enforcement of the relevant legislation. Some people have argued this is because the majority of the targets of prohibitionism are in the category of victimless crime, where they claim the harm that comes from the crime is non-existent, questionable, or only to the person who performs the act and even then the magnitude of the harm being relatively small. Under this interpretation enforcement becomes a conflict between violation of statue and violation of free will. Since the acts prohibited often are enjoyable, enforcement is often the most harmful choice to the individual. This sometimes results in laws which rarely are enforced by anybody who does not have a financial or personal motivation to do so.

The difficulty of enforcing prohibitionist laws also criticized as resulting in selective enforcement, wherein the enforcers select the people they wish to prosecute based on other criteria, resulting in discrimination based on races, culture, nationality, or financial status. For example, American philosopher Noam Chomsky has criticized drug prohibition as being a technique of social control of the "so-called dangerous classes". In a United Nations human rights report released on 20 September 2023, it urged States to move away from an over reliance on punitive, prohibition-based drug control and to move towards harm-reduction and health-centred approaches grounded in human rights. In 2025, policy notes issued by the United Nations Office on Drugs and Crime outlined legal and policy considerations for the decriminalization of drug use and possession for personal use and for the application of alternative measures to convict or punish drug-related cases within the international drug control framework.

Prohibitionism based laws have the added problem of calling attention to the behavior that they are attempting to prohibit. This can make the behavior interesting and exciting, and cause its popularity to increase. This is essentially in relation with the Streisand effect.

Communication research on psychological reactance has found that strong threats to freedom or controlling messages, including bans, can provoke a motivational state that increases resistance to the message and can sometimes heighten interest in the restricted behaviour.

== See also ==
- Gambling
- Gambling in the United States
- Gun prohibition
- Lobbying
- Prohibition
- Prohibition in the United States
- Prohibition of alcohol
- Prohibition of drugs
- Prohibition Party
- Repugnancy costs
- Scottish Prohibition Party
- Smokeasy
- Smoking ban
- Speakeasy
- Sumptuary law
- Temperance movement
