= Diana Schaub =

American political science professor

Diana J. Schaub
- Born: 1959
- Education: Ph.D. University of Chicago
- Occupation(s): professor, Loyola University Maryland

Diana J. Schaub (born 1959) is professor of political science at Loyola University Maryland. Schaub received both her M.A. and Ph.D. from the University of Chicago. She teaches and writes on a wide range of issues in political philosophy and American political thought. Schaub was also a member of The President's Council on Bioethics.

== Career ==
After graduating summa cum laude from Kenyon College, Schaub began her career as an assistant managing editor for the conservative magazine, The National Interest in 1985. She then served as a professor of political science at the University of Michigan-Dearborn. In 2003–2005, while serving as a professor at Loyola College, Schaub taught at a series of lectures and seminars designed for high school teachers, held at Ashland University. The conference was titled, “Race and Rights in American History” and was funded by a Teaching American History grant from the U.S. Department of Education.

From 2001–2007 Schaub served as the chair of the political science department at Loyola College, which became Loyola University Maryland, where she is now a professor.

== Publications ==
Schaub has co-edited or written three books: What So Proudly We Hail: America’s Soul in Story, Speech, and Song, Erotic Liberalism: Women and Revolution in Montesquieu’s "Persian Letters", and His Greatest Speeches: How Lincoln Moved the Nation. Schaub has contributed chapters to several books, including “From Hearth-Fires to Hell-Fires: Hawthorne and the Cartesian Project,” in the book, Apples of Gold in Pictures of Silver: Honoring the Work of Leon R. Kass ISBN 978-0739141595 and “Captain Kirk and the Art of Rule,” in the book Faith, Reason, and Political Life Today ISBN 978-0739102237. Schaub has also been published in many academic journals and newspapers including National Affairs, The Baltimore Sun, and The Public Interest.

- Kass, Amy A., Leon Kass, and Diana Schaub (eds.) (2011). What So Proudly We Hail: America’s Soul in Story, Speech, and Song. Intercollegiate Studies Institute ISBN 1-61017-006-7
- Schaub, Diana J. (1995). Erotic Liberalism: Women and Revolution in Montesquieu's "Persian Letters". Rowman & Littlefield ISBN 0-8476-8039-8
- Schaub, Diana J. (2021). His Greatest Speeches: How Lincoln Moved the Nation. St. Martin's Press ISBN 9781250763457

== Honors and awards ==
Schaub has received numerous awards and fellowships throughout her career. Schaub was awarded the Richard M. Weaver Prize for Scholarly Letters in 2001, and received a research grant from the Earhart Foundation in 1995. She was also appointed to the Hoover Institution’s Task Force on the Virtues of a Free Society in 2007.

== See also ==
- American philosophy
- List of American philosophers
