= Abigail Alliance for Better Access to Developmental Drugs v. von Eschenbach =

- Court: United States Court of Appeals for the District of Columbia Circuit
- Full case name: Abigail Alliance for Better Access to Developmental Drugs, et al v. Andrew C. von Eschenbach
- Argued: October 21, 2005
- Reargued: March 1, 2007
- Decided: August 7, 2007
- Citation: 495 F.3d 695

Case history
- Prior history: 2004 WL 3777340 (D.D.C. Aug. 30, 2004); 445 F.3d 470 (D.C. Cir. May 2, 2006).
- Subsequent history: Cert. denied, 552 U.S. 1159 (2008).

Court membership
- Judges sitting: Douglas H. Ginsburg, David B. Sentelle, Karen L. Henderson, A. Raymond Randolph, Judith Ann Wilson Rogers, David S. Tatel, Merrick B. Garland, Janice Rogers Brown, Thomas B. Griffith, Brett Kavanaugh (en banc)

Case opinions
- Majority: Griffith, joined by Sentelle, Henderson, Randolph, Tatel, Garland, Brown, Kavanaugh
- Dissent: Rogers, joined by Ginsburg

Abigail Alliance for Better Access to Developmental Drugs v. von Eschenbach, 495 F.3d 695 (D.C. Cir. 2007), cert denied, 552 U.S. 1159 (2008) was resolved in early 2008 when the Supreme Court of the United States declined to hear the appeal. Their refusal left standing the appellate court decision, which said that patients have no right to "a potentially toxic drug with no proven therapeutic benefit."

== Background ==
Abigail Burroughs was a college student diagnosed with head and neck cancer. During the later phases of her treatment, Abigail's father, Frank Burroughs, formed an organization, the Abigail Alliance for Better Access to Developmental Drugs and sued the FDA for access to Erbitux. At that time, Erbitux was available experimentally only for patients participating in colon cancer clinical trials. The argument made by the Abigail Alliance in court was that terminal cancer patients have a constitutionally protected right to access to experimental medications before the FDA approves them. Specifically, the Abigail Alliance argued that the FDA should license drugs for use by terminally ill patients with "desperate diagnoses", after they have completed Phase I testing. If successful, the suit would have eliminated FDA prohibitions on selling unapproved drugs, and left the decision entirely in the hands of drug manufacturers.

From its inception, the US Government has charged the FDA with a mission of overseeing testing of new drugs. Challenges to this core definition, as in the Abigail Alliance court case, would likely require broad changes to the FDA's operating mandate.

Implementing the changes proposed by the Abigail Alliance would have exposed some terminally ill patients to treatments which would ultimately not be approved because of inefficacy and toxicity. The expected success rate of cancer drugs at the Phase I stage of clinical testing is 6%.

If the Abigail Alliance had been successful in court, the suit would have radically altered the conduct of clinical cancer research, by providing almost unfettered legal access to experimental drugs by terminally ill patients, who would then have little incentive to enter Phase II and Phase III clinical trials, which are used to determine side effects and efficacy of new drugs. While eligibility factors and geography may limit the ability of some terminally ill patients to access new drugs through clinical trials, those trials also protect patients by collecting safety and efficacy data on new drugs under controlled circumstances.

The von Eschenbach referred to in the case is Andrew von Eschenbach, Commissioner of the FDA from 2006 to 2009, and later a Director at BioTime, a biotechnology company.

== Progression of the case ==
In May 2006, the U.S. Court of Appeals for the District of Columbia ruled in favor of the Abigail Alliance and found that the US Constitution protects the right of terminally ill patients to access treatments that are not approved by the Food and Drug Administration.

The FDA requested that the Court of Appeals rehear the case. The American Society of Clinical Oncology (ASCO) filed an amicus brief to the U.S. Court of Appeals in advance of the March 1 hearing, supporting the FDA's position. ASCO proposed that the Constitution does not guarantee the right to access unapproved medications, and that the court case threatens the cancer clinical trial enterprise.

On March 1, 2007, the U.S. Court of Appeals for the District of Columbia reheard the case en banc. On August 7, 2007, the Court issued an 8–2 decision against the Abigail Alliance, reversing the previous panel decision, thereby upholding the previous court decision that found no constitutional right to unapproved drugs by terminally ill patients. Judge Judith Rogers and Chief judge Douglas Ginsburg dissented.

Frank Burroughs, Abigail's father, vowed to pursue an appeal to the Supreme Court, but the Supreme Court declined to accept the case, which effectively ended the case with the existing FDA regulations intact.

== See also ==
- Expanded access, a long-standing FDA program for providing experimental drugs to patients
- Cases and Materials on Torts, 9th ed. (2008) Richard A. Epstein. (pp. 42)
