= Sophie Haroutunian-Gordon =

- Occupation: Scholar
- Organization: Northwestern University

Sophie Haroutunian-Gordon is a published contributor to the field of Education. She is the Director of the Master of Science in Education Program at Northwestern University, where she is also a professor in the School of Education and Social Policy. She teaches with a focus in the philosophy of education, teacher education, interpretive discussion, and philosophy of psychology. Haroutunian-Gordon began teaching in the Glencoe area of Illinois - she taught sixth grade for five years. She left the faculty of the Department of Education at University of Chicago in 1991, and soon came to Northwestern University to direct the Master of Science in Education Program. Her published work ranges from psychology to the philosophy of education and teacher education. According to Northwestern University, "her second book, Turning the Soul: Teaching Through Conversation, received the American Education Studies Critics Choice Award in 1994. In 1996 she helped to form the Urban/Suburban-Northwestern Consortium of schools, which has received funding from the Joyce Foundation. Haroutunian-Gordon is immediate past president of the Philosophy of Education Society (2003–04)."

== Selected Presentations ==
- April, 2004: Case Study: Listening in an Interpretive Discussion. American Educational Research Association, Annual Meeting. Montreal, Canada
- January, 2004: Growing Tolerant through Dialogue: The Role of Listening. Teachers College, Columbia University. New York, NY
- April, 1998: Teaching in an Ill-Structured Situation. AERA Annual Meeting. New Orleans, LA
- April, 1998: Talking Heads. AERA Annual Meeting. New Orleans, LA
- November, 1991: Turning the Soul: Teaching through Conversation in the High School. Essential Schools Coalition. Chicago, IL
- November, 1990: Turning the Soul: The Role of the Teacher. University of Alberta
- April, 1990: Turning the Soul: Teaching through Conversation. Annual Meeting, Philosophy of Education Society. Miami, FL (with K. Benne)
- April, 1989: Learning as Recollection: Plato, Proust, and J.S. Bach. Annual Meeting of the Philosophy of Education Society. San Antonio, TX
- January, 1989: Learning as Recollection: Its Consequences for Teaching. Presented at a conference honoring the life and work of Joseph Sittler. Chicago, IL
- April, 1988: Dialogue with Plato. AERA Annual Meeting. New Orleans, LA
- March, 1984: Is Psychology a Unified Science?. Boston Colloquium for the Philosophy of Science. Boston, MA

== Selected publications ==
- 2007: Cultivating Questions: A Focus for Schooling in the Twenty-First Century. Yale Press.
- 2005: In Search of Music of Something Else? A Response to 'the Domain of Didactology as a Field of Theory and Research in Music Education,' by Fred Nielsen. Philosophy of Music Education Review 13: 95-98.
- 2004: Listening—in a democratic Society. Schools: A Journal for Inquiry into the Subject Experience of School Life: Vol. 1, Issue 2.
- 1998: How does thinking proceed? A study of thinking patterns in interpretive discussion. Educational Theory.
- 1994: Plato and Education, The International Encyclopedia of Education.
- 1993: Reflections on a Dialogue with Ken Benne. Educational Theory.
- 1992: Soul in Garrison, J.W. and Rud, A.G., Gaps: Ideals Missing from the Educational Conversation. SUNY Press.
- 1991: Turning the Soul: teaching through conversation in the high school. University of Chicago Press.
- 1989: From Socrates to Software: The Teacher as the Text; The Text as Teacher. University of Chicago Press.
- 1983: Equilibrium in the balance: A study of psychological explanation in Brainerd, C.J., Springer Series in Cognitive Development. Springer-Verlag.

== Overview of Turning the Soul: Teaching Through Conversation in the High School ==
By comparing two high school classes' discussions of Romeo and Juliet, Turning the Soul, "offers an alternative to methods advocated by conventional educational practice". According to the University of Chicago Press, the book informs readers "by guiding [them] back and forth between two high school classes discussing Shakespeare's Romeo and Juliet, she gracefully introduces the alternative approach to education: interpretive discussion. One class, located in a private, racially integrated urban school, has had many conversations about the meaning of books. The second group, less advantaged students in a largely black urban school, has not. The reader watches as students in each group begin to draw upon experiences in their personal lives to speculate about events in the play. The students assist one another with the interpretation of complex passages, pose queries that help sustain the conversation, and struggle to "get Shakespeare right." Though the teachers suffer moments of intense frustration, they are rewarded by seeing their students learn to engage in meaningful exchange. Because Turning the Soul draws on actual classroom conversations, it presents the range of difficulties that one encounters in interpretive discussion. The book describes the assumptions about learning that the use of such discussion in the classroom presupposes, and it offers a theoretical perspective from which to view the changes in both students and teachers."
