= Mahmoud ElSohly =

American pharmacologist

Mahmoud A. ElSohly
- Born: Egypt
- Education: University of Cairo (BS, MS); University of Pittsburgh (Ph.D.)
- Known for: Director of the University of Mississippi's Marijuana Research Project
- Scientific career
- Fields: Cannabis research
- Workplaces: University of Mississippi
- Website: Faculty Profile

Mahmoud A. ElSohly is an Egyptian-American pharmacologist known for his research into cannabis. He is a professor of pharmaceutics and research professor at the Research Institute of Pharmaceutical Sciences at the University of Mississippi. He is also the director of the University of Mississippi's Marijuana Research Project, the only legal source of marijuana that can be used for medical research in the United States. He is also the president and laboratory director of ElSohly Laboratories, Inc.

== Education and career ==
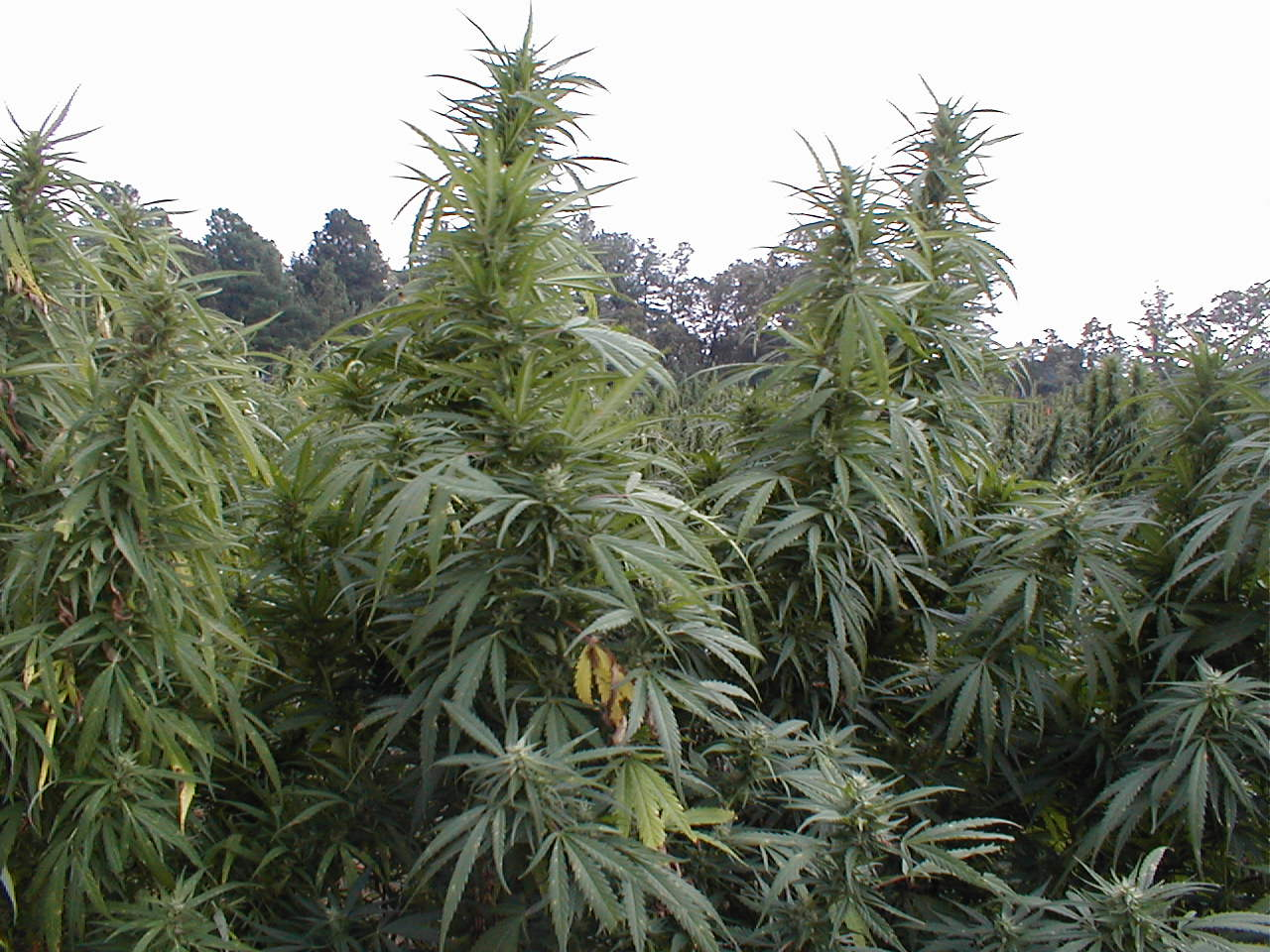
Medicinal cannabis farmed by Dr. ElSohly's Marijuana Research Project at the University of Mississippi.

ElSohly received his B.S. and M.S. from Cairo University, after which he received his Ph.D. from the University of Pittsburgh. He began working at the University of Mississippi in 1976. In 1980, he became the director of their Marijuana Project.

In addition to his work on cannabis, ElSohly's research on urushiol led to the development of PDC-APB, a candidate for a vaccine against skin irritation from poison ivy.

== Books ==
- Suman Chandra, Hemant Lata and Mahmoud A. ElSohly (2017). Cannabis sativa– Botany and Biotechnology. Springer International Publishing. p. 474. ISBN 9783319545646.
- Brian F. Thomas and Mahmoud A. ElSohly (2015). The Analytical Chemistry of Cannabis. Emerging Issues in Analytical Chemistry. Elsevier Science. p. 132. ISBN 9780128046708.
- Mahmoud A. ElSohly (2007). Marijuana and Cannabinoids. Humana Press. p. 322. ISBN 9781592599479.
