= DNA Research =

- Discipline: Genomics
- Language: English
- Edited by: Michio Oishi

Publication details
- History: 1994–present
- Publisher: Oxford University Press for the Kazusa DNA Research Institute (Japan)
- Frequency: Bimonthly
- Open access: Yes
- Impact factor: 2.8 (2025)

Standard abbreviations
- ISO 4: DNA Res.

Indexing
- CODEN: DARSE8
- ISSN: 1340-2838 (print); 1756-1663 (web)
- LCCN: sn94038370
- OCLC no.: 30467755

Links
- Journal homepage

DNA Research is an international, peer-reviewed journal of genomics and DNA research. The journal was established in 1994, and is published by Oxford University Press on behalf of the Kazusa DNA Research Institute. The journal is edited by Michio Oishi.

== Indexing and abstracting ==
In 2026, the journal's impact factor was 2.8, ranking 22nd out of 167 in the category 'Genetics & Heredity'. The journal is indexed and abstracted in the following databases:

- Biochemistry & Biophysics Citation Index
- Biological Abstracts
- BIOSIS Previews
- Biotechnology Citation Index
- Current Contents/Life Sciences
- EMBASE
- Journal Citation Reports/Science Edition
- Science Citation Index Expanded (SciSearch)
- Science Citation Index
- Standard Periodical Directory
