= Leon Kass =

American academic (born 1939)

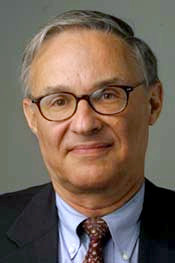
- Born: Leon Richard Kass; February 12, 1939 (age 87); Chicago, Illinois, U.S.
- Education: University of Chicago (BS, MD); Harvard University (PhD)
- Known for: President's Council on Bioethics from 2001 to 2005; appreciation of the natural; opposition to human cloning and euthanasia
- Spouse: Amy Kass (m. 1961; died 2015)
- Awards: Jefferson Lecture (2002)
- Scientific career
- Fields: Bioethics, medicine, human rights
- Workplaces: University of Chicago

Leon Richard Kass (born February 12, 1939) is an American physician, biochemist, educator, and public intellectual. Kass is best known as a proponent of liberal arts education via the "Great Books," as a critic of human cloning, life extension, euthanasia and embryo research, and for his tenure as chairman of the President's Council on Bioethics from 2001 to 2005. Although Kass is often referred to as a bioethicist, he eschews the term and refers to himself as "an old-fashioned humanist. A humanist is concerned broadly with all aspects of human life, not just the ethical."

Kass is the Addie Clark Harding Professor Emeritus in the College and the Committee on Social Thought at the University of Chicago, Senior Fellow Emeritus at the American Enterprise Institute, and the Dean of the Faculty at Shalem College in Jerusalem. His books include Toward A More Natural Science: Biology and Human Affairs; The Hungry Soul: Eating and the Perfecting of our Nature; Life, Liberty, and the Defense of Dignity: The Challenge for Bioethics; The Beginning of Wisdom: Reading Genesis; and What So Proudly We Hail: The American Soul in Story, Speech, and Song.

"For his students and readers," Yuval Levin summarizes, "Leon Kass has laid out a path of inquiry showing that those questions that bedevil us most today have been with us for countless generations, and have to do not with the latest modern excess, but with man’s unchanging nature, wants, needs, and potential. It is a path...that opens with a question: How does man thrive?"

== Early life and education ==
Kass was born in Chicago to Jewish immigrants from Eastern Europe. He described his family as "Yiddish speaking, secular, and socialist." Although his upbringing was not religious, it was moralist: "Morality, not Judaism, was the religion of our home, morality colored progressively pink with socialism, less on grounds of Marxist theory, more out of zeal for social justice and human dignity." He would not begin to explore his religious heritage until later in his career.

Kass enrolled in the University of Chicago at age 15, graduating from the college with a degree in biology in 1958. The college was well known for its extensive core curriculum, and Kass studied the "great books" then prescribed by Chicago's core. "I became a devotee of liberal education . . . with a special fondness for the Greeks." He graduated from the University of Chicago's medical school in 1962 and, following an internship in medicine at the Beth Israel Hospital in Boston, completed a PhD in biochemistry at Harvard University in 1967, working in the laboratory of Nobel laureate Konrad Bloch. Around this time Kass began to develop an interest in morality in medicine and in bio medical ethics, instigated partly as a result of reading Rousseau's Discourse on the Arts and Sciences.

In 1961, Kass married the former Amy Apfel, a fellow graduate of the College of the University of Chicago. As instructors in the college in later years, they would frequently teach seminars together. Their scholarly collaborations include several articles on marriage and courtship and a reader on the subject. In 2011, they published a joint project, What So Proudly We Hail, that uses literature to examine the American soul. Amy Kass died of complications from ovarian cancer and leukemia on August 19, 2015.

Leon and Amy Kass went to Holmes County, Mississippi, during the summer of 1965 to do civil rights work. Working with the Medical Community for Human Rights and the Mississippi Freedom Democratic Party (MFDP), the Kasses "lived with a farmer couple in the Mount Olive community, in a house with no telephone, hot water, or indoor toilet. They visited many families in the community, participated in their activities, and helped with voter registration and other efforts to encourage the people to organize themselves in defense of their rights." Later that fall, Kass wrote a letter to his family and friends detailing his and his wife's experiences and appealing to them to donate to the Civil Rights Movement.

The character of the rural, poor, and uneducated African Americans with whom they lived and worked contrasted with his colleagues at Harvard and other elite universities. It was this experience, he later said, that

caused me to shed my enlightenment faith and ultimately begin a journey in which Jewish thought would ultimately come to play a more prominent part. Why, I wondered then, was there more honor, decency, and dignity among the impoverished and ignorant but church-going black farmers with whom we had lived than among my privileged and educated fellow graduate students at Harvard, whose progressive opinions I shared but whose self-absorption and self-indulgence put me off. If poverty and superstition were the cause of bad character, how to explain this?

== First forays into bioethics ==
After completing his doctorate, Kass conducted molecular biology research for the National Institutes of Health, authoring several scientific papers while serving in the U.S. Public Health Service. His early interest in bioethics was stimulated by Aldous Huxley's Brave New World and C. S. Lewis's The Abolition of Man, both of which he read at the suggestion of Harvey Flaumenhaft. In these books, Kass saw examples of "how the scientific project to master nature could, if we are not careful, lead to our dehumanization, via eugenics, drug-induced contentment, and other transformations of human nature, possibilities already foreseeable in the new biology. . . . Will man remain a creature made in the image of God, aspiring to align himself with the divine, or will he become an artifact created by man in the image of God-knows-what, fulfilling the aspirations only of human will? . . . I soon shifted my career from doing science to thinking about its human meaning."

In 1967, Kass read an article by Joshua Lederberg in the Washington Post suggesting that humans could one day be cloned, permitting the perpetuation of the genotypes of geniuses. In a letter to the editor, Kass made a moral case against cloning and suggested that "the programmed reproduction of man will, in fact, dehumanize him." Thus began a second career of writing on bioethics, including essays on organ transplantation, genetic screening, in vitro fertilization, cloning, the conquest of aging, assisted suicide, medical ethics, and biotechnology. Kass was also involved in founding the Hastings Center. In 1970, he left the laboratory at NIH to become the executive director of the Committee on Life Sciences and Social Policy at the National Research Council of the National Academy of Sciences, which produced the first public document that tried to assess the ethical and social consequences of the coming advances in biotechnology.

== Teaching experience ==
As he moved from biology to bioethics, Kass also moved from full-time research into teaching, first at St. John's College from 1972 to 1976, Georgetown University from 1974 to 1976, and at Chicago from 1976 onward. At St. John's, Kass taught in the Great Books program as well as in-depth studies of Aristotle's De Anima and Nicomachean Ethics and Darwin's On the Origin of Species. At the University of Chicago, Kass taught courses across the humanities and sciences, including both undergraduate and graduate seminars in the Nicomachean Ethics, Plato's Symposium and Meno, Lucretius, human passions, science and society, Rousseau's Discourse on the Origin of Inequality, Genesis, Darwinism, Descartes's Discourse on the Method, classical geometry, Tolstoy's War and Peace, marriage and courtship, Exodus, and biotechnology.

Along with his wife and other colleagues, Kass cofounded in 1977 the "Human Being and Citizen" common core course at Chicago, today the most popular humanities core course at Chicago, devoted to exploring the conflicts between conceptions of what constitutes a good human being/individual versus the demands that society or the State tries to impose upon us. In 1983, he, Allan Bloom, and James M. Redfield founded the "Fundamentals: Issues and Texts" program. Kass taught in and chaired this program for eighteen years. He won the University of Chicago's Llewellyn John and Harriet Manchester Quantrell Award for Excellence in Undergraduate Teaching in 1983 and the Amoco Foundation Award for Distinguished Contributions to Undergraduate Teaching in 1993.

== Views on rape ==
In his 1992 article "Regarding Daughters and Sisters", an examination of the Biblical story of Dinah, Kass writes that "rape is a capital offense, a crime worse even than murder. For the rapist, says the book of Deuteronomy, 'death by stoning.' It has never seemed to me too cruel or excessive a punishment." However, he criticizes the modern conception of rape "as a violation of the will, not a violation of womanliness." Womanliness, for Kass, requires modesty rather than power. He concludes:

Many lonely women, more than can safely admit it, secretly hope to meet a gentleman; but the vast majority steadfastly refuse to be ladies—indeed, no longer know what it means. Small wonder, then, so much sexual harassment and even rape. When power becomes the name of the game, the stronger will get his way. Under such circumstances, one cannot exactly blame women for wanting to learn how to defend themselves against sexual attack. But, addressing the symptom not the cause, the remedies of karate and “take back the night”—and, still more, the shallow beliefs about sexual liberation that support these practices—can only complete the destruction of healthy relations between man and woman. For, truth to tell, the night never did and never can belong to women, except for the infamous women-of-the-night. Only a restoration of sexual self-restraint and sexual self-respect—for both men and women—can reverse our rapid slide toward Schechem.

== President's philosopher ==
As the stem cell controversy brewed in the late 1990s and into 2001, President George W. Bush had to decide whether to allow federal funding for research on stem cells derived from embryos. Many scientists were advocating the removal of limits on embryonic stem cell research, but critics expressed concern about what they characterized as the wanton destruction of human life. In an August 2001 speech, Bush announced that he would support funding research on stem cell lines already created—"where the life and death decision has already been made"—but not on lines created by the further destruction of embryos. And because "[e]mbryonic stem cell research is at the leading edge of a series of moral hazards," Bush said, he would create the President's Council on Bioethics, to be led by Kass and with a mandate to "monitor stem cell research, to recommend appropriate guidelines and regulations, and to consider all of the medical and ethical ramifications of biomedical innovation." As the council was appointed and prepared to begin meeting in early 2002, Kass received a great deal of media attention, especially due to his reputation for pessimism and concern about the moral implications of scientific progress with respect to health and life issues. Calling him "the president's philosopher," U.S. News & World Report noted that "he tends to dwell on the dark side of modern medicine. . . . Kass has tried to raise the public's consciousness of emerging technology's risks to values that humanity holds dear." The council from its inception was charged by Bush to consider these larger questions, well beyond the domain of stem cell research. The first specific task of the council, according to the executive order creating it, was "to undertake fundamental inquiry into the human and moral significance of developments in biomedical and behavioral science and technology."

The composition of the council was also subject to controversy. Kass was accused of "stacking the deck" with philosophers, scientists, and public intellectuals likely to oppose "unfettered medical research in the area of stem cells, therapeutic cloning, and reproductive cloning. Given that fact, researchers had better worry a lot about what the Council is likely to recommend to the president." Critics also charged that Kass eliminated those who disagreed with him, such as Elizabeth Blackburn and William May, and replacing them with opponents of cloning. Kass replied to these criticisms by saying that the council was more intellectually diverse than prior bioethics commissions precisely because it included opponents of abortion. (Previous commissions had "excluded representatives of the right to life movement.") Also, the council members Robert George, Francis Fukuyama and James Q. Wilson debated with stark disagreement their opposing points of view on the biological status of the human embryo and came to no agreed conclusions. Since Bush had deliberately created the council to debate and clarify the issues without necessarily reaching consensus, Kass said that he welcomed disagreement within the council: "This council is easily the most intellectually and ethically diverse of the bioethics commissions to date. We have worked with mutual respect while not papering over our differences. No one who has attended any of our meetings or read the transcripts can believe that we do anything but serious and careful work, without regard to ideology, partisan politics or religious beliefs."

The council has been renewed by executive order every two years since 2001, and the subjects it considered ranged beyond the stem cell battles during which it was established. Kass sought throughout to develop a "richer" bioethics, attentive to larger human and philosophical questions at the root of bioethical dilemmas, and he lamented that the council was pigeonholed: "The Council came into existence identified as the 'stem cell council,' and people on all sides of the embryo research debate seem to care more about the Council's views on this subject than about anything else. Not by our choice—and certainly not by mine—the Council was born smack in the middle of 'embryoville,' and it has never been able to leave this highly political field." Despite the public's narrow conception of its work, during Kass's chairmanship, the Council produced five book-length reports, a white paper, and a humanistic reader on ten topics generally neglected in the bioethics literature.

Kass described the council's work as "public bioethics," rejecting previous approaches that favored government by self-appointed "experts"—scientific or bioethical—and presenting the issues in terms accessible to the broader public and its political representatives. He sought a "richer" inquiry that debates "ends as well as means," and the council's reports addressed larger human questions, "not merely administrative or regulatory ones." He said that it presented all sides of ethical issues in order to create a more substantive moral discourse. "A proper bioethics must lead public reflection on the ways in which new biotechnologies may affect those things that matter most regarding how human lives are lived," Kass wrote. "This means beginning by reflecting upon the highest human goods and understanding the latest technological advances in this light." Eschewing much of the language and theoretical framework of academic bioethics, Kass drew on literary, philosophical, and theological sources to inform the council's discussion. At the council's first meeting, he led a discussion of "The Birth-Mark," a short story by Nathaniel Hawthorne.

Kass stepped down as chairman of the Council in October 2005 and remained a member of the council until 2007. He returned to positions at the American Enterprise Institute and the University of Chicago.

== Views on bioethics ==
=== Biotechnology and medical enhancement ===
While welcoming biotechnology for its therapeutic promise—to cure disease, relieve suffering, and to restore health and wholeness—Kass worries about its uses for enhancement (boosting capability beyond what is given naturally and even altering human nature). While biotechnology offers great promise for health care, it has applications for "many other ends, good ones and bad." Biotechnology can be employed to produce "better children, superior performance, ageless bodies, and happy souls." Kass argues that biotechnology may eventually be used as a substitute for virtue, hard work, study, or love in order to "fulfill our deepest human desires," but in the end lowering the reach of those desires only to those objects that can be realized technologically. His worries about biotechnology stem from what he calls "the technological disposition," which transforms the meaning and character of human life by believing that "all aspects of life can be rationally mastered through technique."

=== Stem cell research ===
Kass has been a consistent critic of embryo research, including embryonic stem cell research, because of its "exploitation" and "destruction" of nascent human life. Although he claims to be agnostic about the moral standing of an early human embryo, he worries about treating human life, at whatever stage, merely as a natural resource. "There is something deeply repugnant and fundamentally transgressive about such a utilitarian treatment of prospective human life," he writes. But because he recognized the potential of such cells for medical research, he led the President's Council on Bioethics to examine alternative avenues of obtaining pluripotent stem cells: "Pluripotent cells might be obtainable from already dead (not just unwanted or doomed but actually dead) embryos, some of whose individual cells might nonetheless still be viable; from living embryos by nondestructive biopsy; from bioengineered, embryo-like artifacts; and from reprogrammed body cells, taken from children or adults, that are induced to return to the undifferentiated state of pluripotency. . . . We should be hopeful that a technological solution to our moral dilemma might soon be found and that this divisive piece of our recent political history will soon come to an end."

In 2007, in two separate studies, research teams led by James Thomson and Shinya Yamanaka created induced pluripotent stem cells from adult cells, meaning that the destruction of embryos for stem cells might no longer be necessary. In 2009, the reprogramming technique was further improved, as skin cells were returned to pluripotency by the transfer of a few exogeneous genes and without the use of foreign viruses as vectors. Robert P. George praised Kass as the driving intellectual force against embryo-killing and in favor of finding alternative methods of obtaining pluripotent stem cells: "All along, it was Dr. Kass who said that reprogramming methods would, if pursued vigorously, enable us to realize the full benefits of stem cell science while respecting human dignity."

=== Human cloning ===
Kass supports a universal ban on the cloning of humans on the grounds that cloning is an affront to morality and human dignity. In a 1997 article in The New Republic entitled "The Wisdom of Repugnance," Kass suggests that we should respect the revulsion most people feel about cloning human beings, just as we respect their supposed revulsion at incest and cannibalism. "In crucial cases," he writes, "repugnance is the emotional expression of deep wisdom, beyond reason's power fully to articulate it." Kass writes that modern ethical discourse, which emphasizes autonomy, equity, and utility, fails to provide the moral guidance that the modern world demands:

Repugnance, here as elsewhere, revolts against the excesses of human willfulness, warning us not to transgress what is unspeakably profound. Indeed, in this age in which everything is held to be permissible so long as it is freely done, in which our given human nature no longer commands respect, in which our bodies are regarded as mere instruments of our autonomous rational wills, repugnance may be the only voice left that speaks up to defend the central core of our humanity. Shallow are the souls that have forgotten how to shudder.

A society that tolerates cloning, Kass writes, "has forgotten how to shudder [and] always rationalizes away the abominable. A society that allows cloning has, whether it knows it or not, tacitly said yes to converting procreation into manufacture and to treating our children as pure projects of our will."

In response to Kass, other ethicists have argued that reactions of repugnance or disgust are not a valid basis for banning cloning because such feelings are subjective, dictated by cultural norms, and change over time. Fritz Allhoff of the American Medical Association Division of Bioethics contends that "racial integration once elicited the same sentiments of repugnance that Kass claims that cloning elicits now; surely public sentiment should not be taken as a moral guide." Martha Nussbaum has advanced a broader argument against using feelings of disgust as a basis for policymaking, writing that "laws and social rules" should be based on "substantive harm, rather than on the symbolic relationship an object bears to our anxieties."

In addition to opposing cloning on the grounds of repugnance, Kass has also argued that cloning constitutes an "unethical experiment upon the resulting child-to-be"; creates confusions of identity and individuality; "turns begetting into making"; and, by giving parents control over a child's genetic make-up, exacerbates the "dangerous" idea of parental control over children's lives and prospects. "One must never forget that these are human beings upon whom our eugenic or merely playful fantasies are to be enacted," he writes.

=== Concern for the natural ===
Although he appreciates that human beings are always modifying what is naturally given, Kass worries about the lack of standards for human life in a world in which human nature is treated as utterly malleable and in which the boundaries of human life are all eroded. Kass places "special value on the natural human cycle of birth, procreation and death" and views death as a "necessary and desirable end" and the human and human aspirations that are derived from it. He views human mortality as a blessing in disguise, and he has opposed deliberate efforts to increase maximum human life expectancy in pursuit of biological immortality. Kass was an early critic of the widespread use of reproductive technologies like in vitro fertilization, partly because he was concerned that their use obscures truths about the essence of human life and society that are embedded in the natural reproductive process. (He later endorsed the marital use of in vitro after Louise Brown was born in 1978.)

Kass sees human cloning as a natural progression from the decoupling of sex and procreation, begun with in vitro fertilization: "Cloning turns out to be the perfect embodiment of the ruling opinions of our new age. Thanks to the sexual revolution, we are able to deny in practice, and increasingly in thought, the inherent procreative teleology of sexuality itself. But, if sex has no intrinsic connection to generating babies, babies need have no necessary connection to sex. . . . For that new dispensation, the clone is the ideal emblem: the ultimate 'single-parent child.'" As in his other writings, Kass emphasizes the connection of reproduction to marriage and family life: "No child conceived with the aid of assisted reproductive technologies should be denied the lineage and biological ties to two parents that all children born 'naturally' have. No child should have to say, 'An embryo was my father.'"

In his first book, Kass proposed that modern science could become a "more natural science" that would be both Aristotelian and Darwinian in its comprehensive understanding of nature. Such a science could move "from nature to ethics." "A more natural science might be useful for ethics," because it would show how ethics is "part of nature," and so "the natural, rightly understood, might even provide some guidance for how we are to live" (xi, 346-48).

But then, in 2002, with the publication of his essay "The Permanent Limitations of Biology," he repudiated his "more natural science" of biological ethics. He spoke of "the insufficiency of nature for ethics" and "the difficulty in looking to biology--even a more natural science more true to life--for very much help in answering the questions about how we are to live" (296-97).

== Philosophical studies ==
For much of his career, Kass's scholarship moved away from the practical issues of bioethics to issues of human nature and human good, and nearly all of his teaching at Chicago has been about these topics. Yet despite his stated interest in "the natural," Kass does not hold to any traditional teaching of "natural law," and he does not derive any moral rules from nature. Rather, he sees human nature as offering, at most, intimations and "pointings" toward human flourishing and human fulfillment, but pointings in need of both cultural encouragement and restraint if humans are to become the upright animal advertised in his special posture.

== Biblical studies ==
In addition to his studies in natural philosophy and philosophical anthropology, Kass has in recent years been teaching and writing about the Hebrew Bible, especially the book of Genesis. Kass's interest in the Bible began with weekly invitational readings of Genesis that he and his wife, Amy, had organized for students while teaching at the University of Chicago. In his 2009 Jefferson Lecture, Kass said that he found in the Bible "an account of human life that can more than hold its own with the anthropological and ethical teachings offered by the great poets and philosophers," with "teachings of righteousness, humaneness, and human dignity . . . that were undreamt of in my prior philosophizing." Kass reads the text philosophically, not theologically, in the belief that this text, thoughtfully read, has much to teach everyone—believers and non-believers alike—about the human condition and how it may be improved. His full lengthy commentary on Genesis, based on his teaching of the text over twenty years, is addressed primarily to the "children of skeptics" (such as himself). He concludes:

Long dwelling with the book of Genesis, and ever marveling at its beauty, its profundity, and, above all, its power to illuminate and lift the soul, this exhilarated reader of Genesis stands before it on his intellectual knees, filled with awe and gratitude for a text that makes such insights possible. I dare to hope that, with my book as a companion, other wisdom-seeking readers may enjoy a similar experience.

In his book on Exodus, what Kass says about the Divine Presence in the Tabernacle suggests an atheistic religiosity: religious feelings of transcendence, of being in touch with God, but without believing any religious doctrines about the real existence of God. God "exists" only in the minds and actions of people who feel awe and reverence in their experience of "the ecstatic passions of Dionysus" elicited by religious ceremony (430). If Israel were to stop worshipping God, then God would be dead. He would "go into eclipse," and He would "cease to be" (500-503, 598, 603, 689).

== Philosophical influences ==
- Aldous Huxley
- Hans Jonas
- Jacob Klein
- C. S. Lewis
- Adolf Portmann
- Paul Ramsey
- Kurt Riezler
- Erwin Straus
- Leo Strauss

== Public lectures ==
In 1991, Kass delivered the sixth Erasmus Lecture, titled Man and Woman: An Old Story, sponsored by First Things magazine and the Institute on Religion and Public Life. In his address, Kass examined the meaning of sexual difference through the lens of biblical and philosophical reflection, exploring how the relationship between man and woman reveals enduring truths about human nature, love, and moral order. The lecture reflected Kass’s broader interest in bioethics and the moral foundations of human life.

== Honors and awards ==
Kass was named the 2009 Jefferson Lecturer by the National Endowment for the Humanities. The Jefferson Lecture is "the highest honor the federal government bestows for distinguished intellectual and public achievement in the humanities." Kass's lecture, delivered at the Warner Theatre in Washington, D.C., on May 21, 2009. was entitled "Looking for an Honest Man: Reflections of an Unlicensed Humanist". In his lecture, he expressed the view that science has become separated from its humanistic origins and the humanities have lost their connection to metaphysical and theological concerns.

He received the Quantrell Award.

In addition to his teaching awards from the University of Chicago, Kass also received the Harvard Centennial Medal and the Intercollegiate Studies Institute's Gerhard Niemeyer Award in 2003 and the inaugural Bradley Prize from the Lynde and Harry Bradley Foundation in 2004. He has been given honorary degrees by the University of Dallas (1997), the Spertus Institute of Jewish Studies (2001), Carthage College (2002), and Yeshiva University (2003). Kass is a fellow of the Hastings Center.

== Family ==
In 2015, his wife, Amy Kass, died.

He has two married daughters and four granddaughters; they reside in Chicago and Jerusalem.

== Selected bibliography ==
=== Books ===
- Leon R. Kass, Founding God's Nation: Reading Exodus, New Haven: Yale University Press, 2022.
- Leon Kass and Hannah Mandelbaum, Reading Ruth: Birth, Redemption, and the Way of Israel, Philadelphia: Paul Dry Books, 2021.
- Leon R. Kass, Leading a Worthy Life: Finding Meaning in Modern Times, New York: Encounter Books, 2017.
- Amy A. Kass and Leon R. Kass, eds., The Meaning of Martin Luther King Jr. Day. What So Proudly We Hail, 2013.
- Amy A. Kass, Leon R. Kass, and Diana Schaub, eds., What So Proudly We Hail, The American Soul In Story, Speech, And Song. Intercollegiate Studies Institute, 2012. (ISBN 1610170067)
- Leon R. Kass, The Beginning of Wisdom: Reading Genesis. New York: Free Press, 2003. (ISBN 0-7432-4299-8)
- ———, Life, Liberty, and the Defense of Dignity: The Challenge for Bioethics. San Francisco: Encounter Books, 2002. (ISBN 1-893554-55-4)
- Amy A. Kass and Leon R. Kass, eds., Wing to Wing, Oar to Oar: Readings on Courting and Marrying. South Bend, Ind.: University of Notre Dame Press, 2000. (ISBN 0-268-01960-6)
- Leon R. Kass and James Q. Wilson, The Ethics of Human Cloning. Washington: AEI Press, 1998. (ISBN 0-8447-4050-0)
- Leon R. Kass, The Hungry Soul: Eating and the Perfecting of Our Nature. New York: Simon and Schuster, 1994. (ISBN 0-226-42568-1)
- ———, Toward a More Natural Science: Biology and Human Affairs. New York: Free Press, 1985. (ISBN 0-02-918340-5)

=== Articles and lectures ===
- Leon R. Kass. "Working as Meaningful Fulfillment" 2012 Irving Kristol Lecture, American Enterprise Institute, Washington, DC, May 2, 2012.
- Leon R. Kass. "Science, Religion, and the Human Future." Commentary (2007): 36–48.
- Leon R. Kass. "Abraham Lincoln's Re-Founding of the Nation" Delivered at the AEI World Forum, June 22, 2007.
- Leon R. Kass and Eric Cohen. "'Cast Me Not Off in Old Age.'" Commentary (2006).
- Leon R. Kass. "Ageless Bodies, Happy Souls: Biotechnology and the Pursuit of Perfection." The New Atlantis 1 (2003): 9–28
- ———. Foreword. In Human Cloning and Human Dignity: An Ethical Inquiry, report of the President's Council on Bioethics. New York: PublicAffairs, 2002. (ISBN 1-58648-176-2)
- ———. "The Wisdom of Repugnance: Why We Should Ban the Cloning of Human Beings." The New Republic (June 2, 1997).
- ———. "The End of Courtship." The Public Interest 126 (1997): 39–63.
- ———. "Living Dangerously: Am I My (Foolish) Brother's Keeper?" Bradley Lecture, American Enterprise Institute, Washington, March 14, 1994.
- ———. "The Ethical Dimensions of In Vitro Fertilization." American Enterprise Institute, 1979.

== See also ==
- "Brave New World argument"
