= Rebecca Dresser =

American legal scholar (born 1952)

Rebecca S. Dresser (born 5 April 1952) is an American legal scholar and medical ethicist.

Dresser earned a bachelor of arts degree in psychology and sociology at Indiana University Bloomington in 1973, followed by a master's of science in education at the same institution in 1975. She then graduated from Harvard Law School in 1979. She began teaching at the Washington University in St. Louis in 1983, was appointed Daniel Noyes Kirby Professor of Law, and granted emeritus status upon retirement. Between 1992 and 1993, Dresser returned to Harvard as faculty fellow of the Safra Center for Ethics.

She was diagnosed with cancer of the head and neck in 2006.

== Selected publications ==
- Dresser, Rebecca. "Dworkin on Dementia: Elegant Theory, Questionable Policy". The Hastings Center Report, Vol. 25, No. 6 (Nov.-Dec. 1995), pp. 32-38.
- Beauchamp, Tom L.; Orlans, F. Barbara; Dresser, Rebecca; Morton, David B.; Gluck, John P., eds. (1998). The Human Use of Animals: Case Studies in Ethical Choice. Oxford University Press. ISBN 9780195119084.
- Dresser, Rebecca (2001). When Science Offers Salvation: Patient Advocacy and Research Ethics. Oxford University Press. ISBN 9780195143133.
- Dresser, Rebecca, ed. (2012). Malignant: Medical Ethicists Confront Cancer. Oxford University Press. ISBN 9780199757848.
- Dresser, Rebecca (2016). Silent Partners: Human Subjects and Research Ethics. Oxford University Press. ISBN 9780190459277.
