= National Bioethics Advisory Commission =

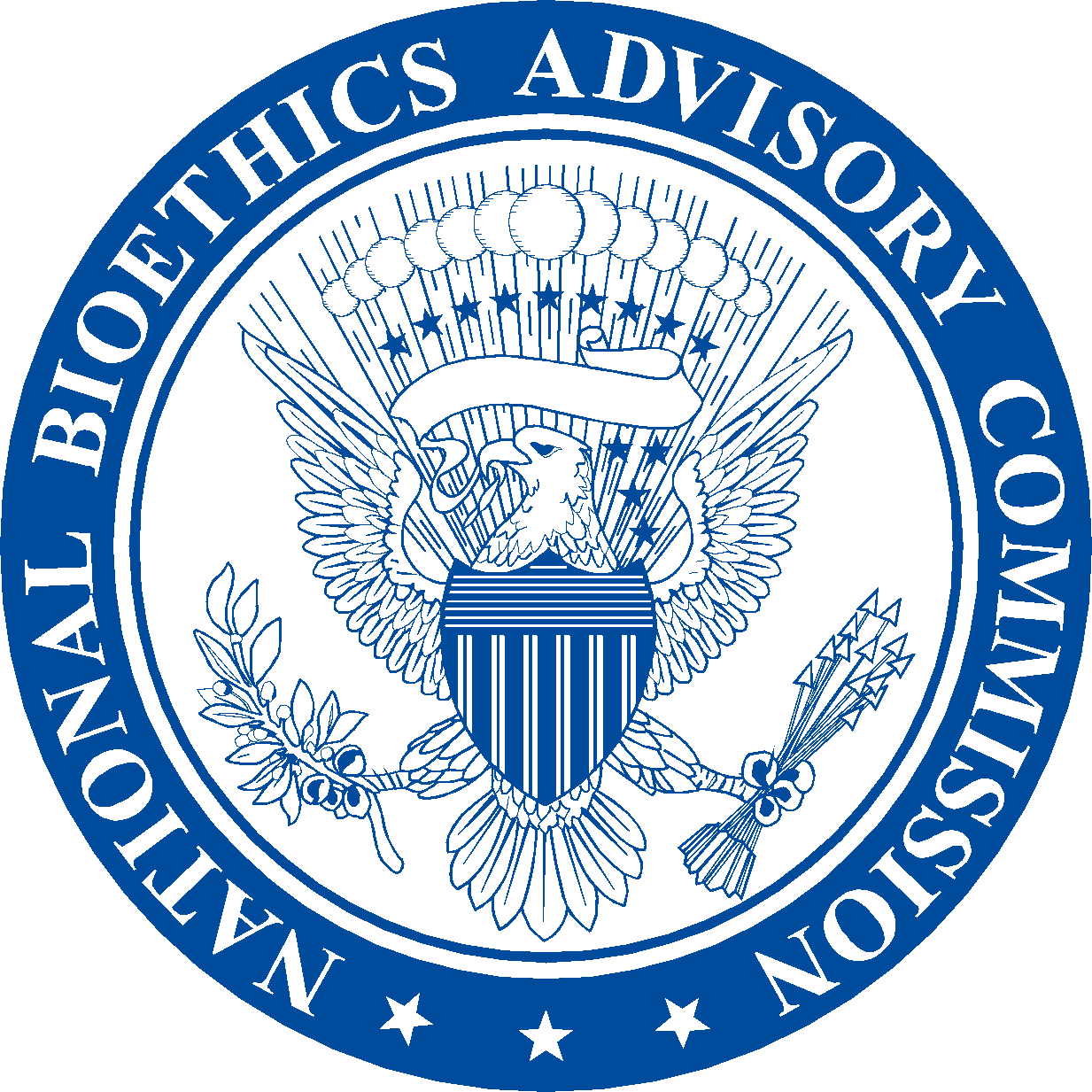

The National Bioethics Advisory Commission was the name of a United States governmental organization which existed from 1996 to 2001. It was replaced by The President's Council on Bioethics.

== Reports ==
In 1999 the NBAC issued a report containing 23 recommendations on the governance of biobanks. Other work during its existence was the creation of 120 recommendations on bioethics issues human cloning, research involving mental vulnerable persons, research with human biological specimens, stem cell research, clinical trials in developing countries but sponsored by the United States, and privacy for research participants.

Here are the titles of the reports published by the commission:

- Ethical and Policy Issues in Research Involving Human Participants
- Ethical and Policy Issues in International Research: Clinical Trials in Developing Countries
- Ethical Issues in Human Stem Cell Research
- Research Involving Human Biological Materials: Ethical Issues and Policy Guidance
- Research Involving Persons with Mental Disorders That May Affect Decisionmaking Capacity
- Cloning Human Beings
