= Mera J. Flaumenhaft =

Mera Joan Flaumenhaft (née Oxenhorn, April 28, 1945 - December 30, 2018) was an American academic and translator who taught at St. John's College, Annapolis MD. Her translation of Niccolò Machiavelli's Mandragola is widely used in college courses throughout the country. She received her Bachelor of Arts degree from the University of Chicago in 1966, before moving on to get a Master of Arts (1967) and the Ph.D. in English from the University of Pennsylvania in 1970. where her dissertation was entitled "Politics and Technique in the Plays of John Arden". While at the University of Pennsylvania she was both a Woodrow Wilson Fellow and a University of Pennsylvania Foundation Fellow. She was also an assistant professor of English at Anne Arundel Community College. She was the author of "The Civic Spectacle: Essays on Drama and Community" and "Priam the Patriarch, his City and his Sons". She was married to the political scientist Harvey Flaumenhaft.

== Early life ==
She was the daughter of the educator and author Joseph Oxenhorn and the sister of the scholar and author Harvey Oxenhorn.
