= Joseph Oxenhorn =

- Born: 1914
- Died: 1989 (aged 74–75)
- Occupations: educator and author

Joseph Oxenhorn (August 23, 1914 – October 29, 1989) was an American educator and prolific textbook author. After attending Brooklyn College and receiving a master's degree from Columbia University, he became a teacher and eventually a principal in the New York City school system. Oxenhorn stayed in the city's education system for over 30 years, retiring in 1971. He is noted for having authored 18 science textbooks. His daughter is the political theorist and translator Mera J. Flaumenhaft and his son is the Harvard scholar and author Harvey Oxenhorn.

He died of prostate cancer in 1989.

== Works ==
- Pathways in Science Series with Michael Norman Idelson (12 vols.), Globe Book Co., 1968

Physics

  - The Forces of Nature (Vol. 1)
  - Matter and Energy (Vol. 2)
  - Sound and Light (Vol. 3)

Earth Science

  - The Earth We Live On (Vol. 1)
  - Oceans of Air and Water (Vol. 2)
  - Energy and Space (Vol. 3)

Biology

  - The Materials of Life (Vol. 1)
  - Built for Living (Vol. 2)
  - The Next Generation (Vol. 3)

Chemistry

  - The Materials of Nature (Vol. 1)
  - Chemistry of Mixtures (Vol. 2)
  - Chemistry of Metals (Vol. 3)
- Teaching Science to Underachievers in Secondary Schools, Globe Books Co., 1972
- Man and Energy in Space, Globe Book Co., 1975
- Oceanography and Our Future, Learning Trends, 1975
- Energy and Our Future, Globe Book Co., 1979
