= List of St. John's College (Annapolis/Santa Fe) people =

The following is a list of notable individuals associated with St. John's College, with campuses in Annapolis, Maryland, and Santa Fe, New Mexico – both in the United States.

== Faculty ==
- Douglas Allanbrook, tutor, musician and composer
- Wye Jamison Allanbrook, tutor, musicologist
- Eva Brann, tutor, dean; 2005 recipient of the National Humanities Medal
- James M. Cain, novelist; professor of journalism 1923–24
- Elliott Carter, composer; tutor, 1939–1941
- William Hersey Hopkins, academic, first president of Goucher College, former acting president of St. John's College
- Leon Kass, tutor at the college (1972–76); chair of the President's Council on Bioethics (2002–06)
- Jacob Klein, tutor, dean; author of Greek Mathematical Thought and the Origin of Algebra and Commentary on Plato's Meno; leading 20th-century Platonist
- Sara Larkin, artist; creator of Spacescapes
- Thomas Parran, 6th Surgeon General of the United States
- Leo Strauss (1899–1973), political philosopher; lectured at St. John's and was the Scott Buchanan Distinguished Scholar in Residence at the Annapolis campus
- Victor Zuckerkandl, tutor, music theorist

== Students and alumni ==
This includes graduates of both the undergraduate and graduate programs.

=== Academics ===
- Rogers Albritton, philosopher; served as the chairman of both Harvard and UCLA's philosophy departments
- Thomas J.J. Altizer, theologian, author of The Gospel of Christian Atheism
- Amber E. Boydstun, political scientist and data scientist
- John Bremer, educator, philosopher, author; after graduating from Oxford University, he came to St. John's College in 1951 on a Fulbright Fellowship
- Graham Harman, philosopher
- Joseph J. Himmel, Jesuit missionary and president of Georgetown University
- Mark D. Jordan, alumnus; Andrew Mellon Professor, Harvard Divinity School; scholar of gender studies, sexual ethics, and theology
- Wilfred M. McClay, intellectual historian
- Ange Mlinko, poet and critic, Guggenheim Fellow 2014–15, poetry editor of The Nation, associate professor at the University of Florida
- Tom G. Palmer, senior fellow at the Cato Institute
- Ben Sasse, president, University of Florida
- Pamela Sklar (1959–2017), psychiatrist and neuroscientist
- O. Carter Snead, legal scholar and bioethicist
- Louis Leo Snyder (1907–1993), German scholar and historian

=== Writers, critics, and journalists ===
- Michael Anton, writer; former deputy assistant to the president for Strategic Communications
- Ken Baumann, writer, publisher, and former actor
- Timothy P. Carney, Washington Examiner columnist and fellow at the American Enterprise Institute
- Caitlin Cass, cartoonist
- Seth Cropsey, director of the Center for American Seapower at the Hudson Institute; regular contributor to the National Review
- Robert A. George, journalist and news columnist
- Danny Hakim, investigative journalist at The New York Times
- Rax King, author, Sloppy: Or, Doing It All Wrong
- William Kowalski, author, Eddie's Bastard, Somewhere South of Here, The Adventures of Flash Jackson, The Good Neighbor
- Andrew Krivak, author, National Book Award nominee for The Sojourn
- Kenneth Kronberg, printing company owner, former LaRouche movement member
- Tony Lagouranis, activist and author of Fear Up Harsh: An Army Interrogator's Dark Journey through Iraq
- Lydia Polgreen, New York Times opinion columnist, former editor-in-chief of The Huffington Post, 2006 winner of the George Polk Award
- Salvatore Scibona, alumnus and author, 2008 National Book Award finalist for his first novel The End; his fiction has appeared in many literary journals; named one of "20 under 40" notable authors by The New Yorker in 2010 and published an essay about his experience at the college in the June 13, 2011 issue
- Lisa Simeone, National Public Radio host
- Charles Van Doren, garnered notoriety for his involvement in the rigged game show Twenty-One
- Cecelia Watson, writer (Semicolon: The Past, Present, and Future of a Misunderstood Mark]
- Jennifer Wright, writer
- John C. Wright, alumnus and author of science fiction and fantasy novels; Nebula Award finalist for his fantasy novel, Orphans of Chaos

=== Military personnel ===
- Lewis J. Fields (1909–1988), United States Marine Corps lieutenant general
- William H. Harrison (1896–1955), brigadier general in the Marine Corps during World War II
- Erik S. Kristensen (1972–2005), U.S. Navy SEAL, attended Graduate Institute in Annapolis, killed in action in Afghanistan
- James B. Lockwood (1852–1884), Army officer and arctic explorer
- Robert Houston Noble, U.S. Army brigadier general, honorary Master of Arts, 1894
- Reginald H. Ridgely Jr. (1902–1979), U.S. Marine Corps lieutenant general, POW during World War II

=== Politicians ===
- Michael Anton, essayist, speechwriter and former private-equity executive who was previously a senior national security official
- Joshua J. Cohen, mayor of Annapolis, Maryland
- Clement Dorsey, congressman for Maryland's 1st congressional district (1825–31)
- Alexander Contee Hanson, congressman for Maryland's 3rd District (1813–1816)
- Emerson Harrington, governor of Maryland
- J. T. C. Hopkins (1843–1922), Maryland state delegate
- Reverdy Johnson, statesman and jurist, defense attorney of Sandford in the Dred Scott v. Sandford case
- Arturs Krišjānis Kariņš, prime minister of Latvia (2019–2023)
- John Leeds Kerr, U.S. representative, Maryland's 7th District
- Francis Scott Key, United States attorney for the District of Columbia; lyricist of the United States national anthem, "The Star-Spangled Banner"
- Daniel Martin, governor of Maryland (1829–1830, 1831)
- Keith Neville, 18th governor of Nebraska (1917–1919)
- Thomas Parran Jr., 6th Surgeon General of the United States
- William Pinkney (1764–1822), 7th attorney general of the United States
- Alvin Milton Spessard (1860–1924), Alabama state politician and educator
- Frederick Stone, U.S. representative from Maryland's 5th congressional district (1867–71), defense counsel for Samuel Mudd
- Lucy Tamlyn, U.S. ambassador to Benin
- Francis Thomas, governor of Maryland (1842–44); member of House of Representatives (1861–69)
- Tobias Watkins (1780–1855), 4th auditor of the United States Treasury, writer, editor, and physician
- Osborne I. Yellott (1871–1922), state delegate and lawyer

=== Filmmakers and musicians ===
- Betsy Arakawa, classical pianist
- Dimitri Devyatkin, Emmy Award–nominated video artist and filmmaker
- Ahmet Ertegün, founded Atlantic Records in 1947
- Jac Holzman, founded Elektra Records in 1950 while a student at St. John's
- Eilen Jewell, blues and Americana singer/songwriter
- Jonathan D. Krane, film producer, Look Who's Talking, Face/Off
- Jeremy Leven, novelist, screenwriter and director (works include Don Juan DeMarco)
- Lhasa de Sela, singer-songwriter
- Glenn Yarbrough, original lead tenor of The Limeliters
- Lee David Zlotoff, creator of MacGyver television series; director of The Spitfire Grill (1996), which won the Audience Award at the Sundance Film Festival

=== Businesspeople ===
- James H. Frame, computer programming pioneer at IBM, and former vice president of software at ITT; founded James Frame Enterprises (JFE), a software development consulting company
- John Seward Johnson III, co-founder of BuzzFeed, founded Eyebeam, philanthropist, filmmaker (Without a Trace, Ratchet) and entrepreneur
- Eugene V. Thaw, art dealer and collector
- Warren Winiarski, founder of Stag's Leap Wine Cellars

=== Chefs ===
- Daniel Rose, chef at restaurants in Paris (Spring, La Bourse et la Vie) and New York City (Le Coucou)
- Miyoko Schinner, chef, cookbook author, animal sanctuary founder and owner of cheese brand Miyoko's Creamery

=== Scientists ===
- Daryl Haggard, astronomer and associate professor of physics at McGill University
- Cynthia Keppel, physicist
- Aron Wall, 2019 Breakthrough New Horizons in Physics Prize for fundamental insights about quantum information, quantum field theory and gravity

== Board members ==
- Austin Ligon, co-founder/CEO (retired), CarMax, Inc.
- James T. Woodward, banker; owner of a major Thoroughbred horse dynasty; member of St. John's board of visitors; recipient of honorary degree of Doctor of Laws in 1909; namesake of Woodward Hall

== See also ==
- List of people from Annapolis, Maryland
- List of people from Santa Fe, New Mexico
