= List of people from Santa Fe, New Mexico =

This is a list of Santa Feans: (Note: /ˌsæntə ˈfeɪəns/ SAN-tə FAY-uns. The demonym of Santa Fe in Spanish is santafecino (Spanish pronunciation: [santafesino]) or santafecina depending on gender. Although seldom used, santafecine is a gender-neutral form.) people who were born in, lived in, or are closely associated with the city of Santa Fe, New Mexico.

== Gallery ==
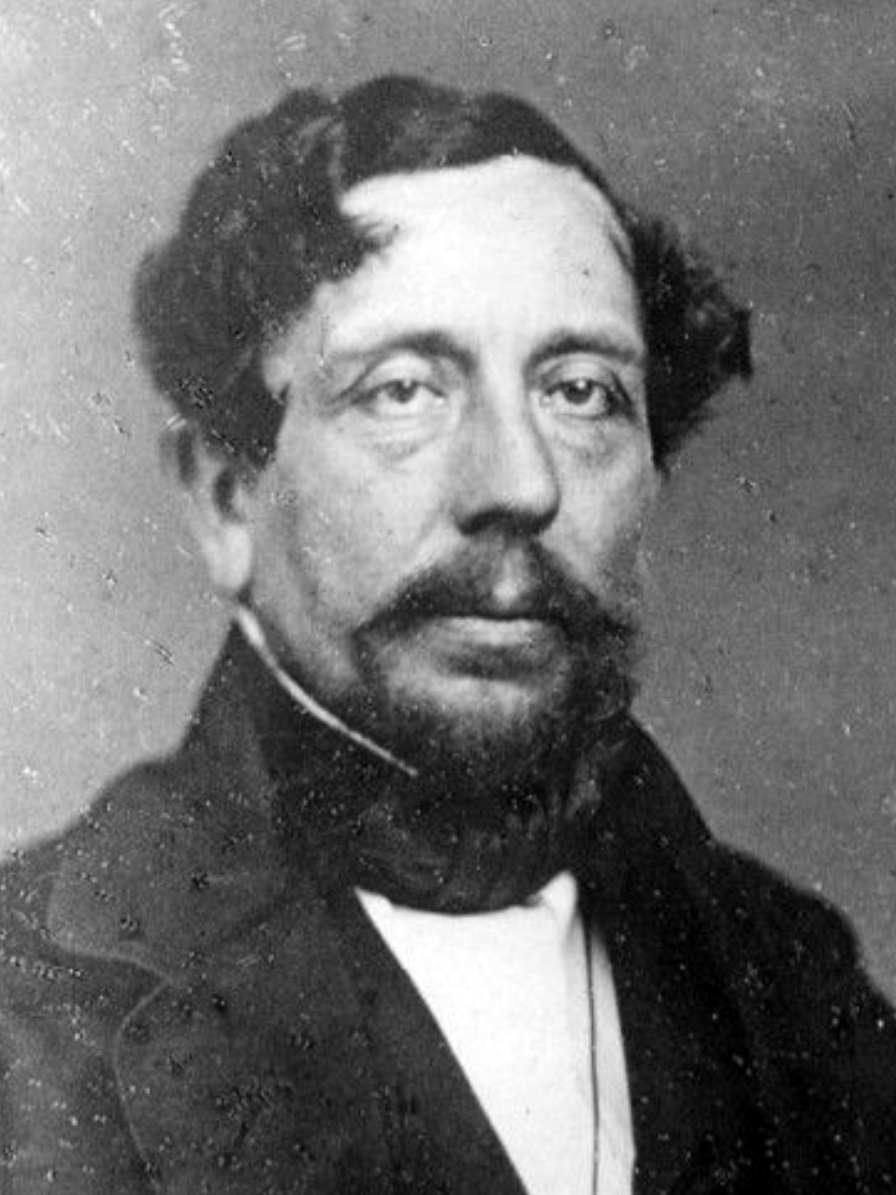
David W. Alexander

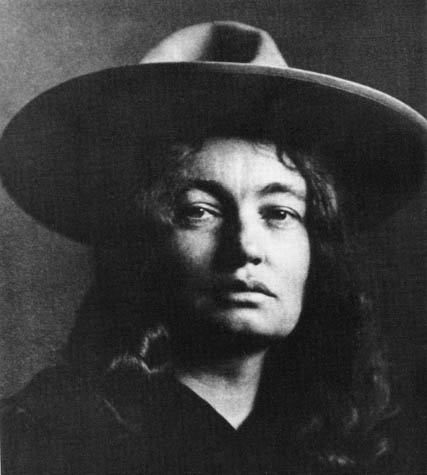
Mary Hunter Austin

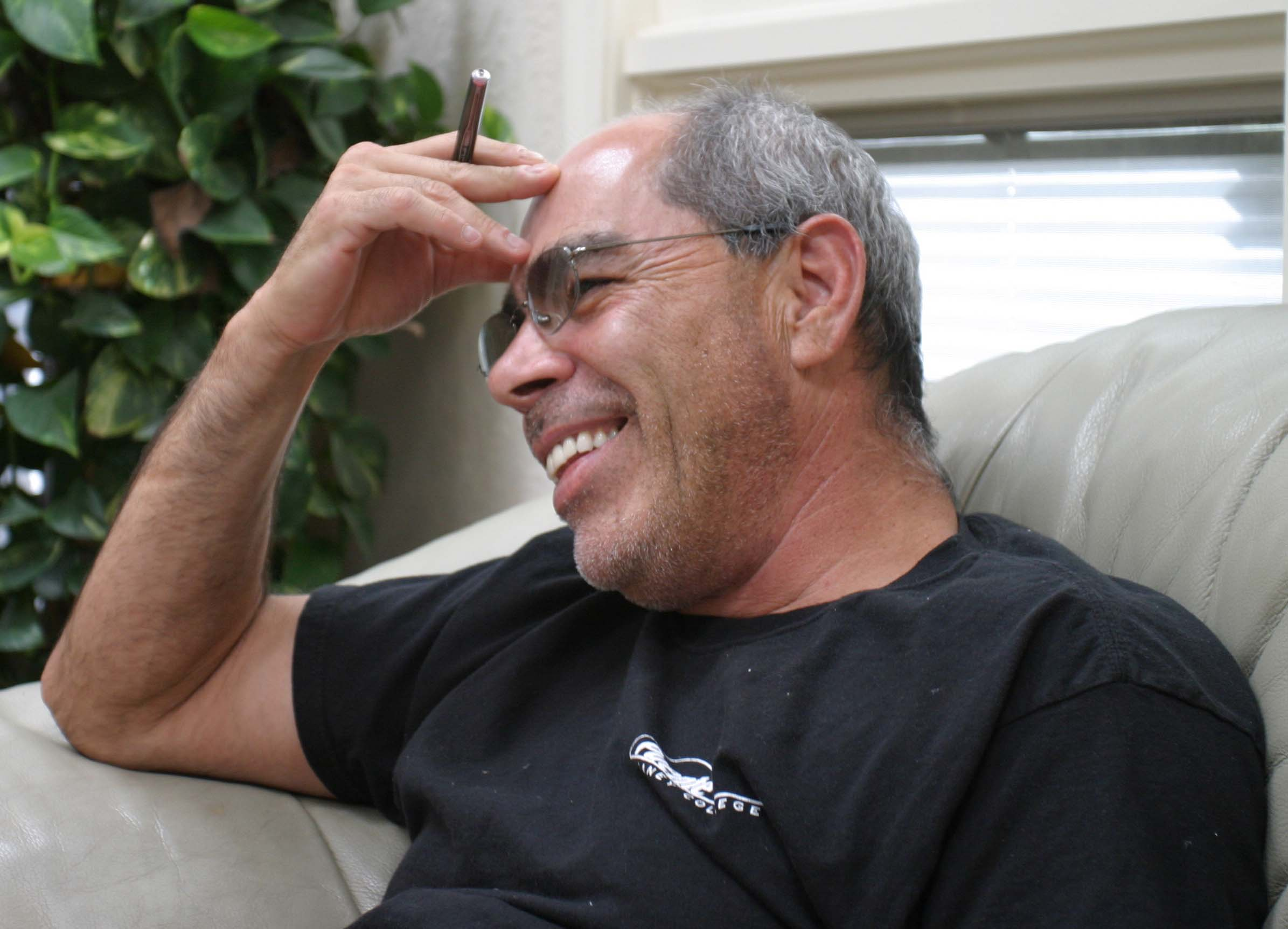
Jimmy Santiago Baca

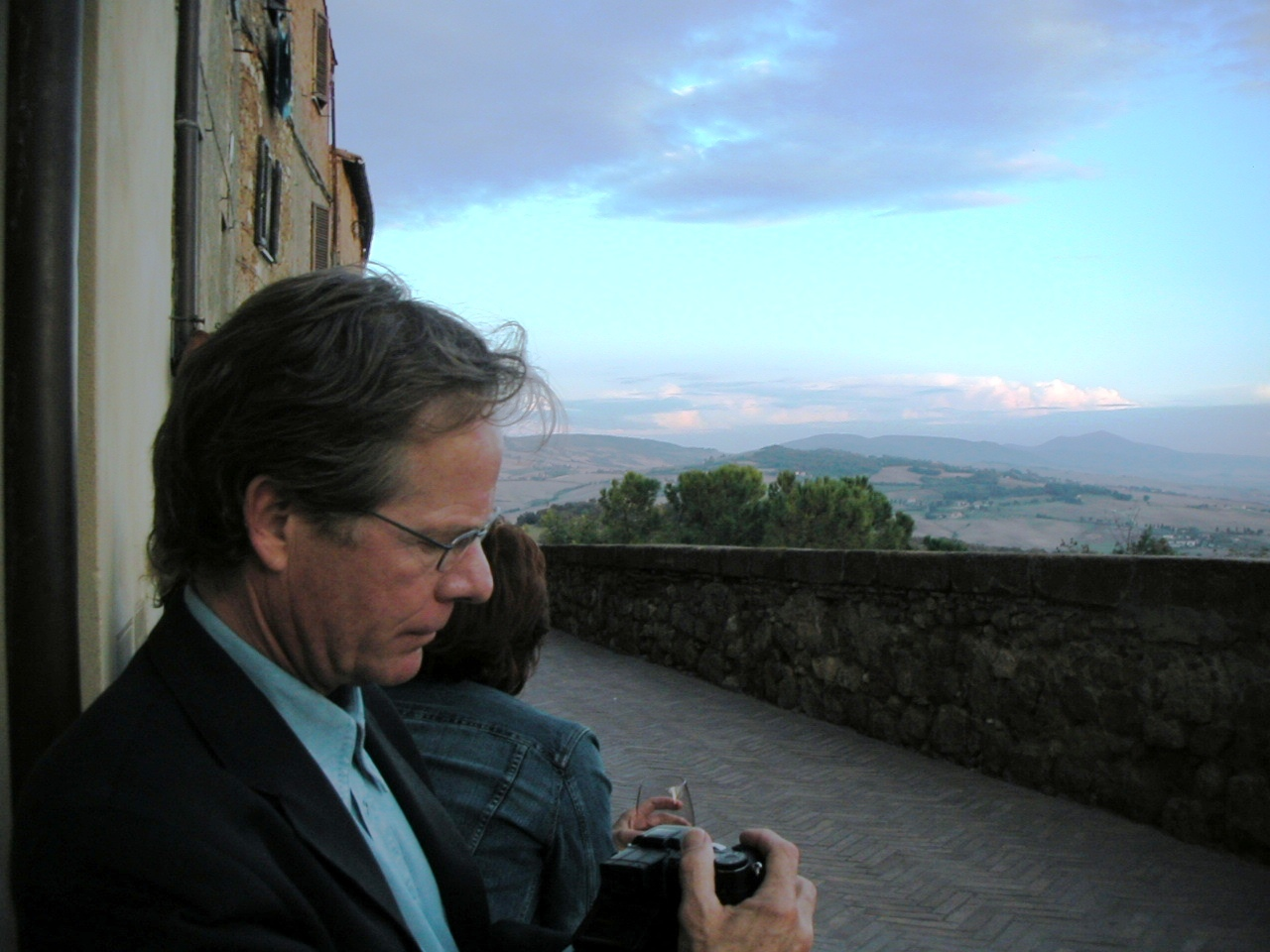
William Berra

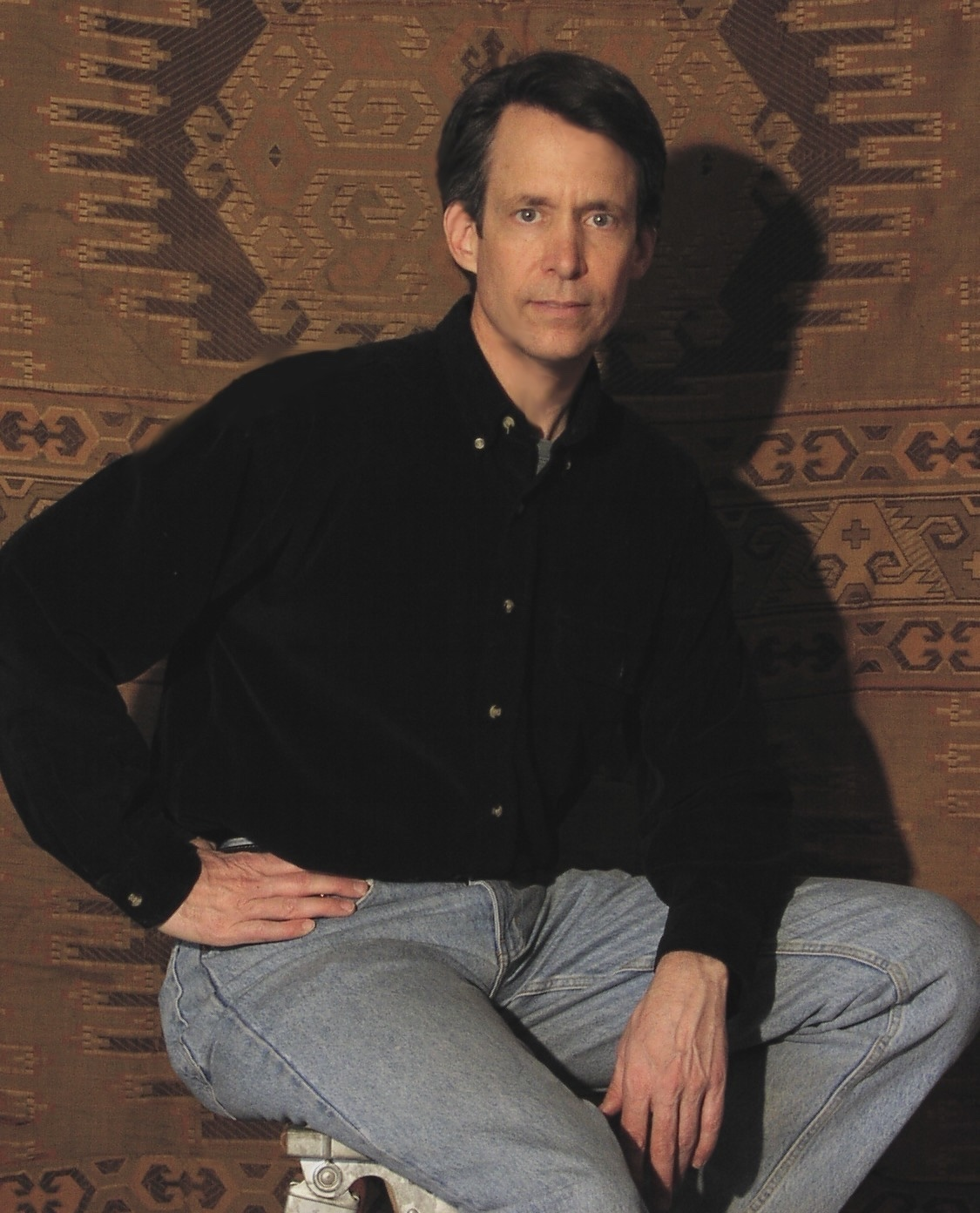
Ned Bittinger

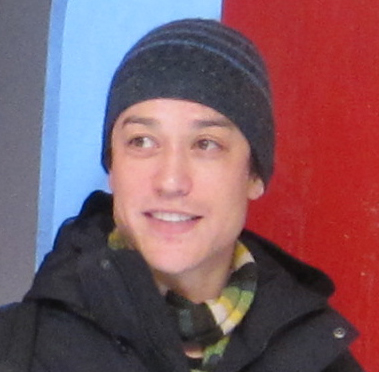
Dana Tai Soon Burgess

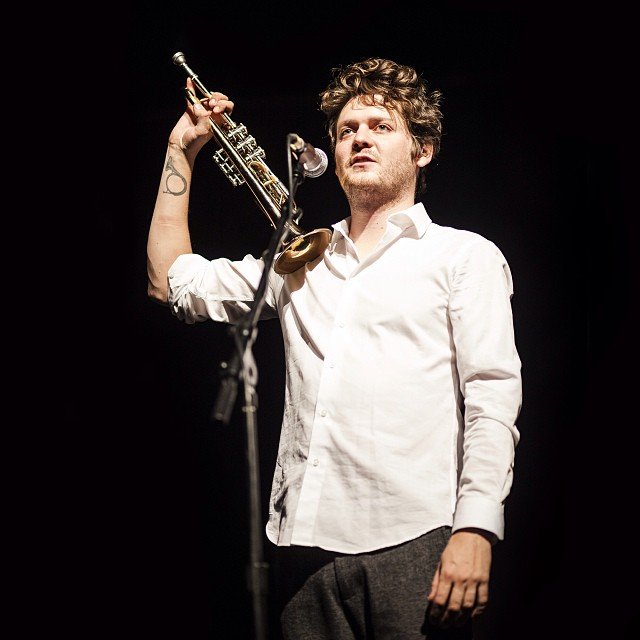
Zach Condon

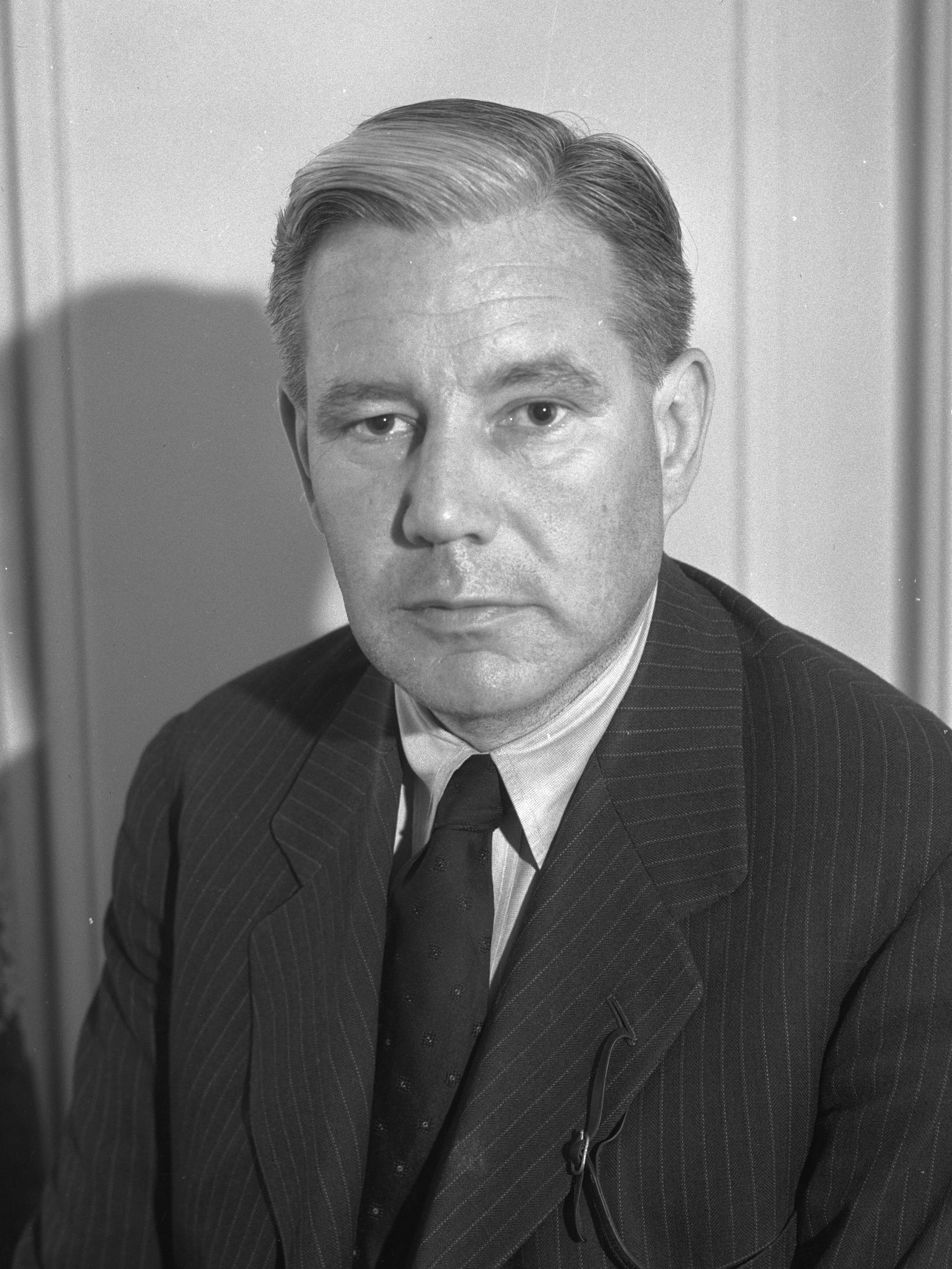
Bronson M. Cutting

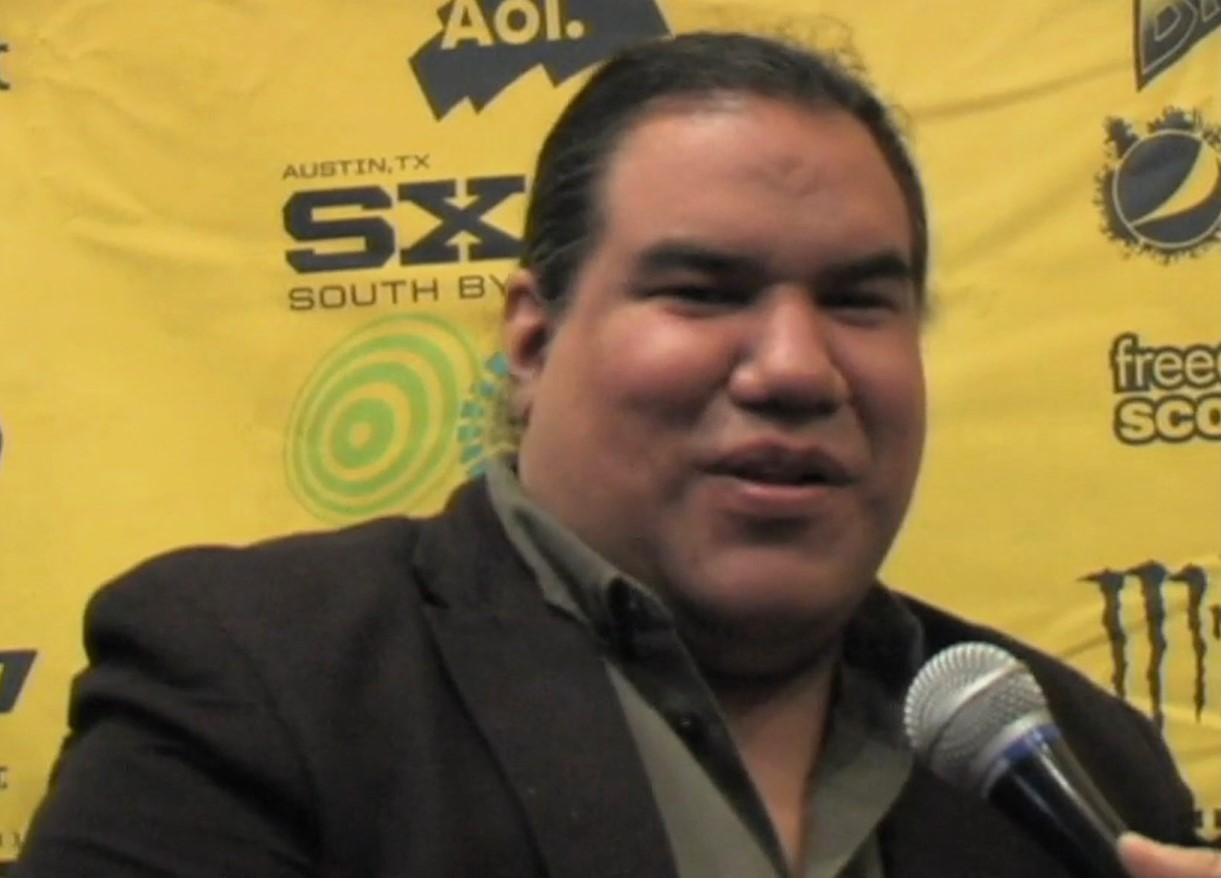
Chris Eyre

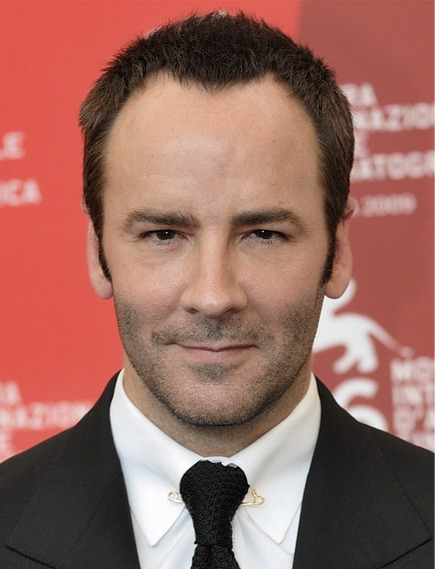
Tom Ford

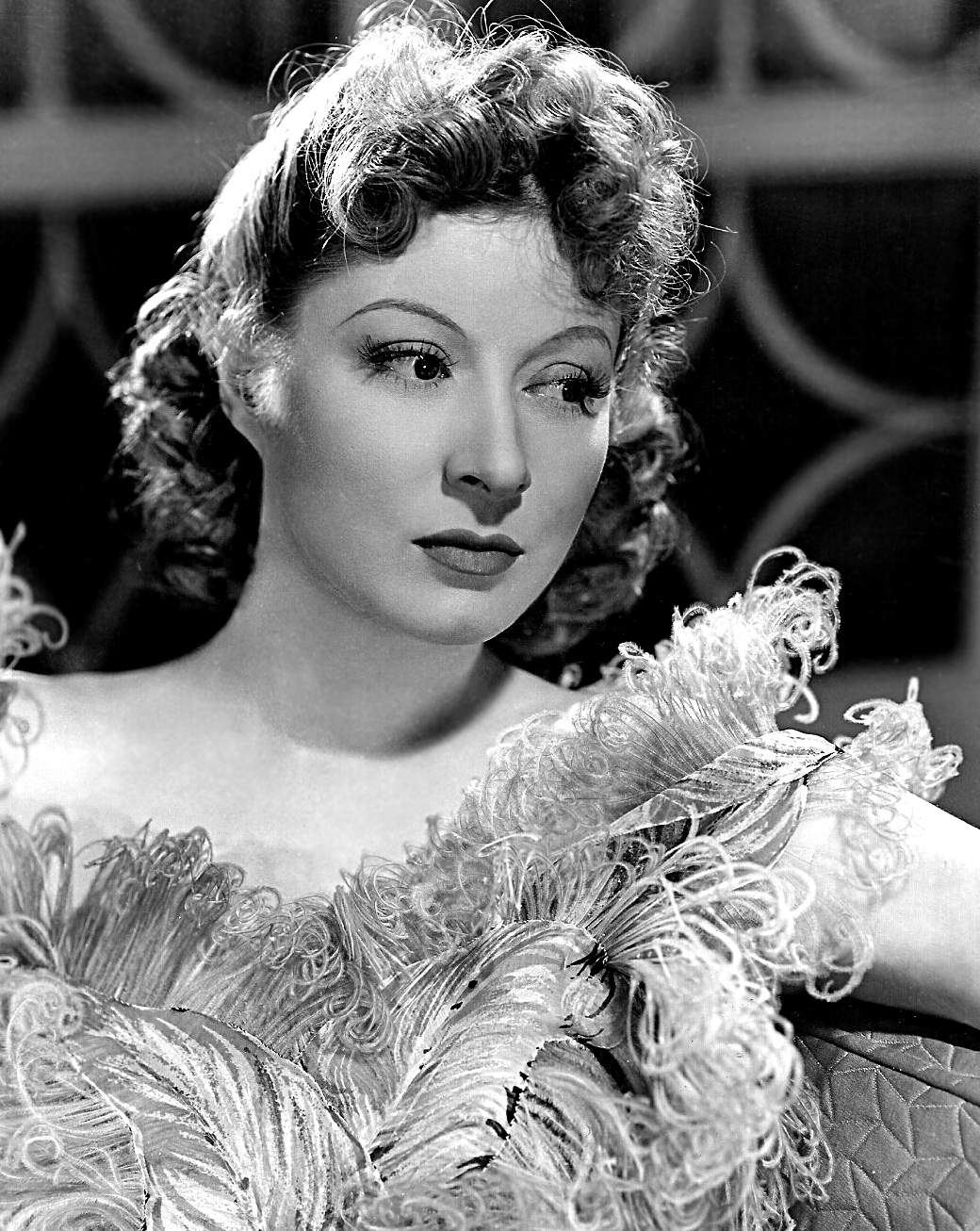
Greer Garson

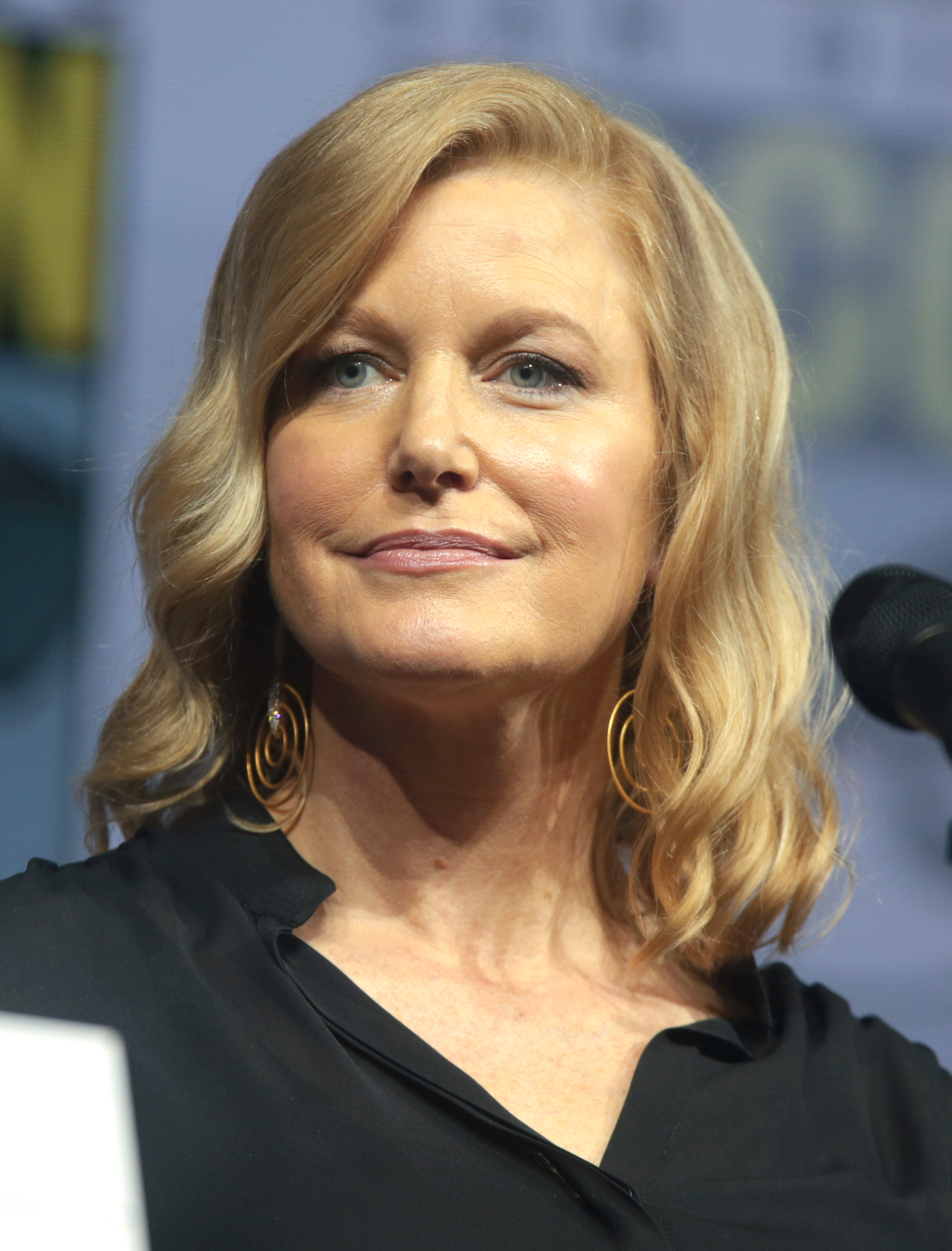
Anna Gunn

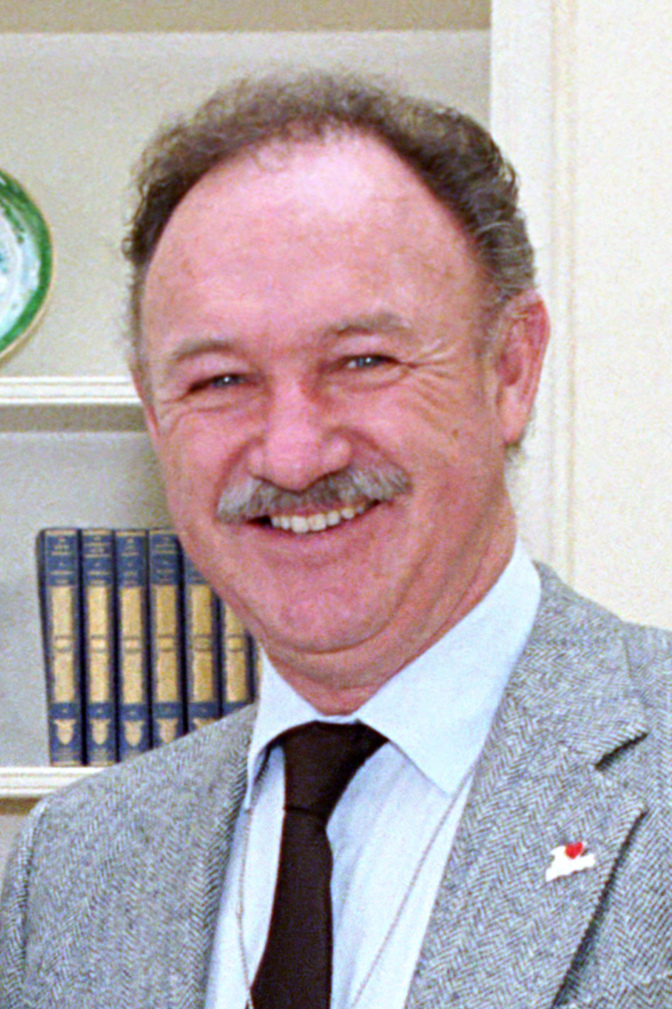
Gene Hackman

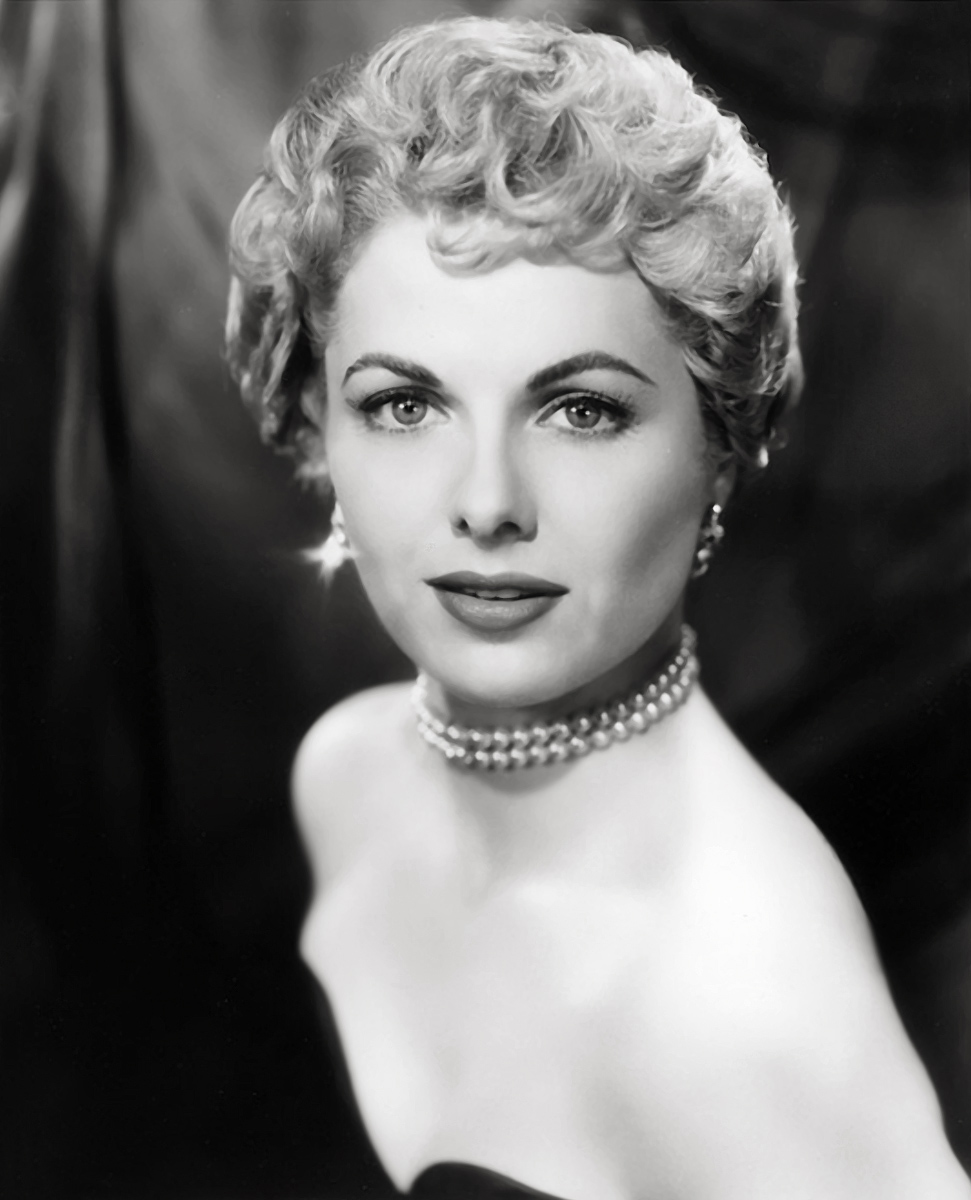
Martha Hyer

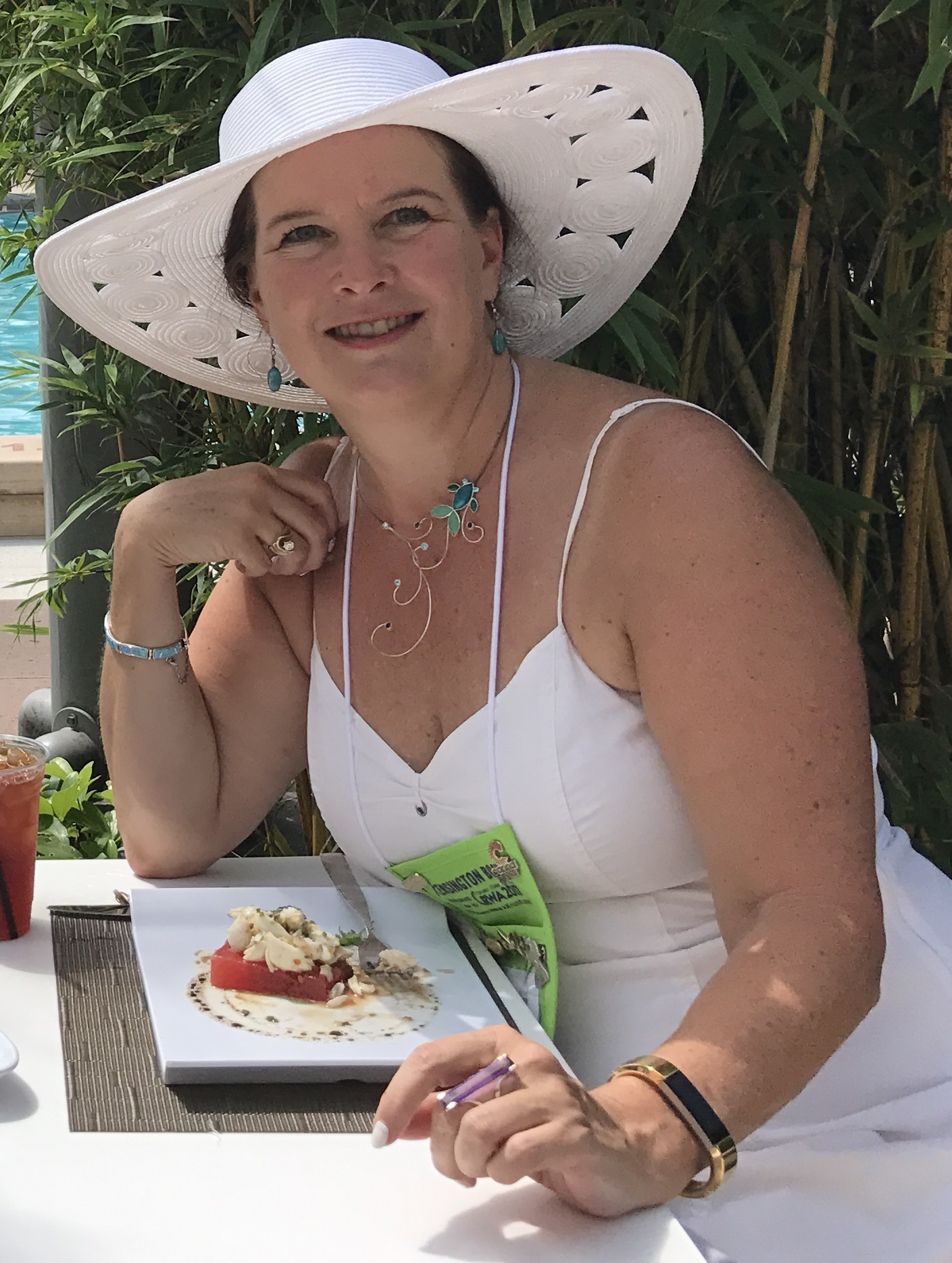
Jeffe Kennedy

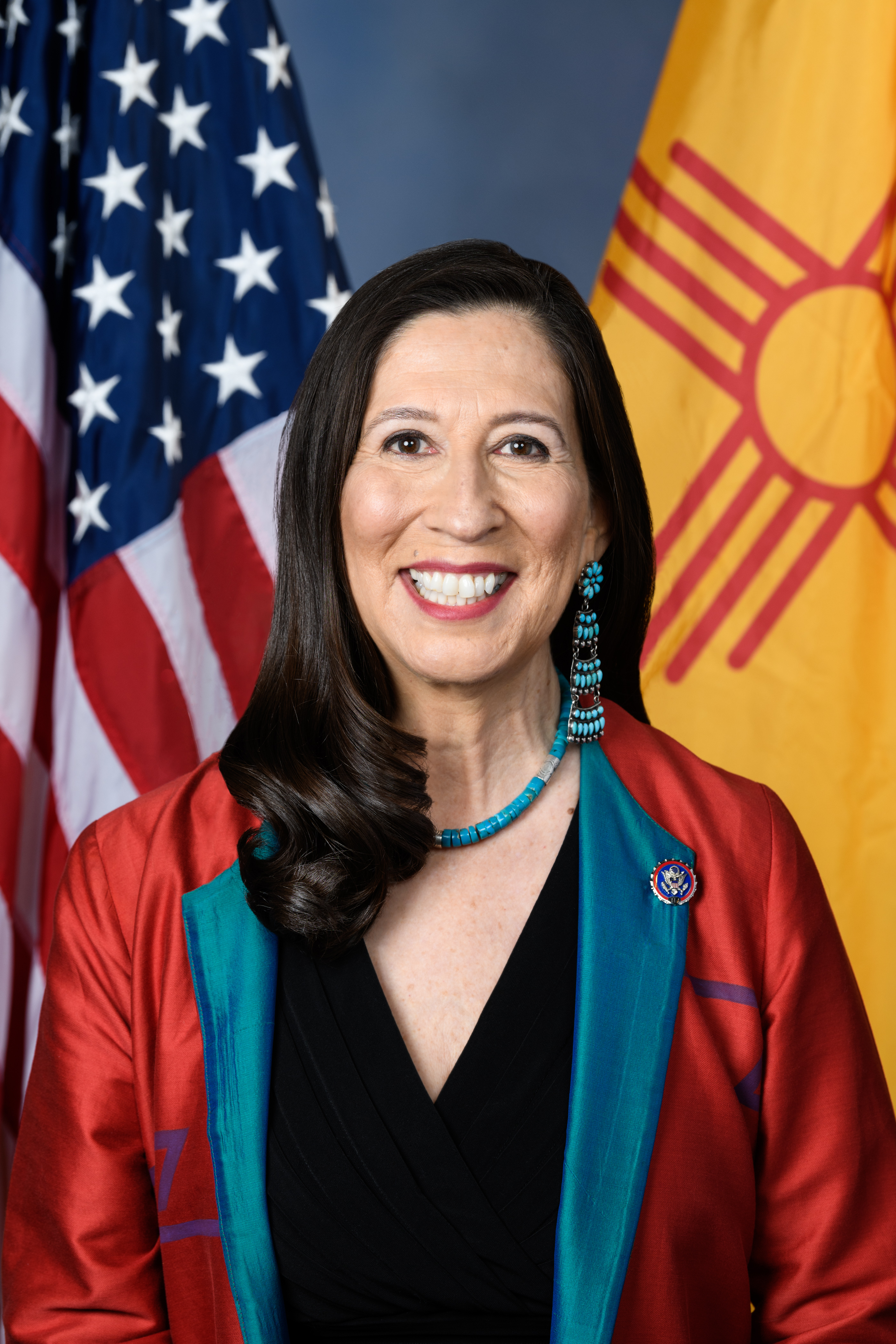
Teresa Leger Fernández

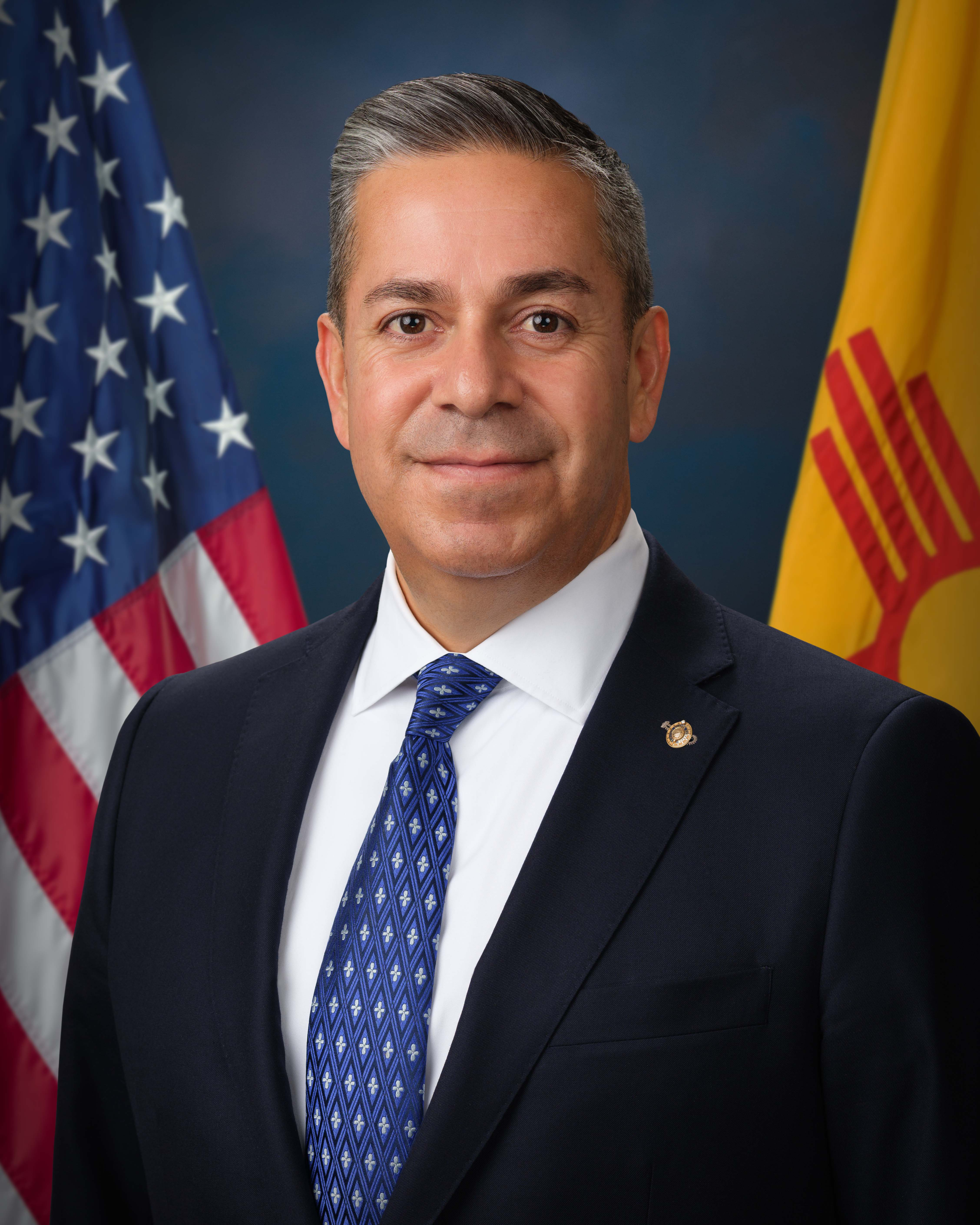
Ben Ray Luján

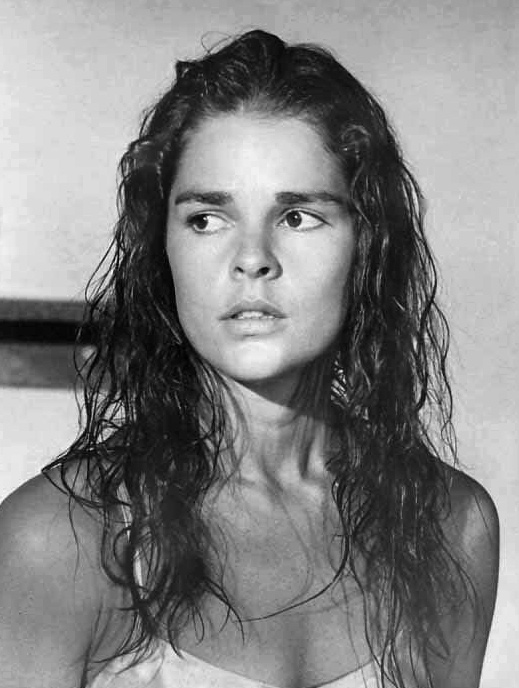
Ali MacGraw

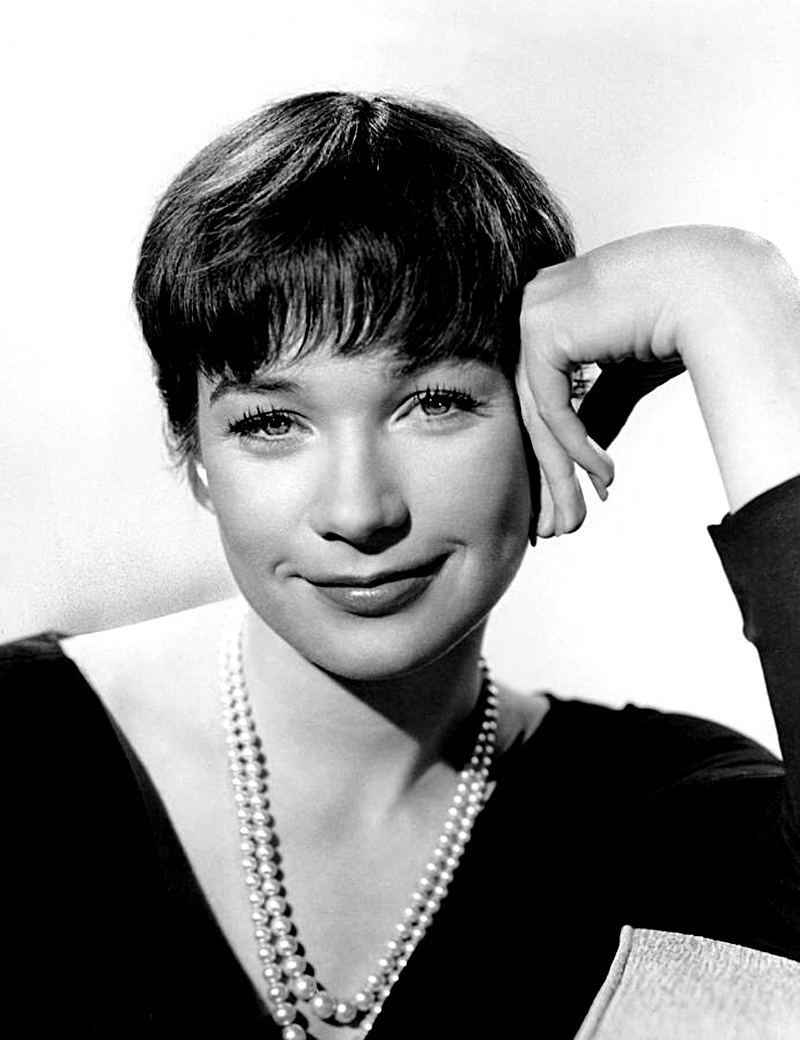
Shirley MacLaine

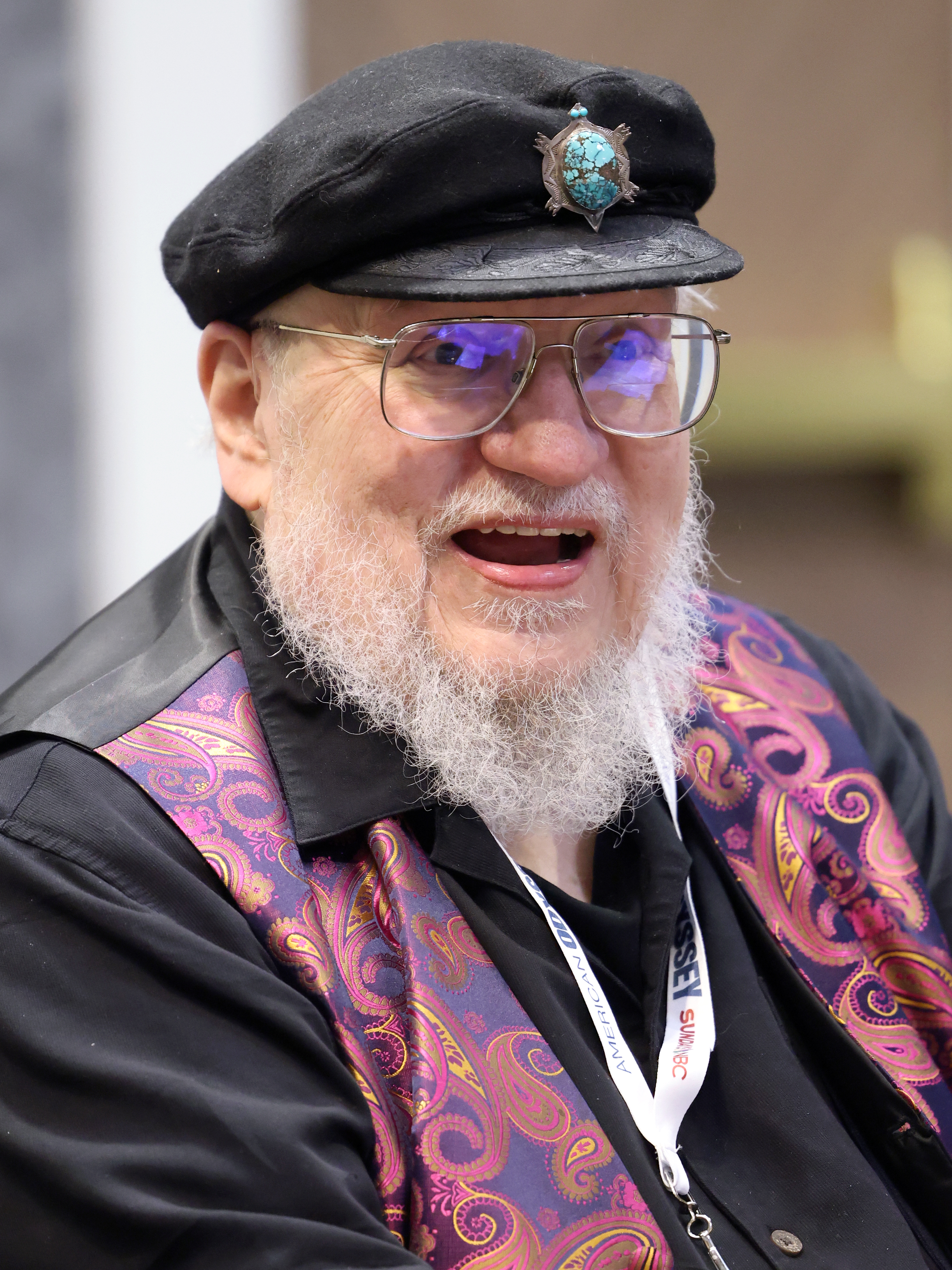
George R. R. Martin

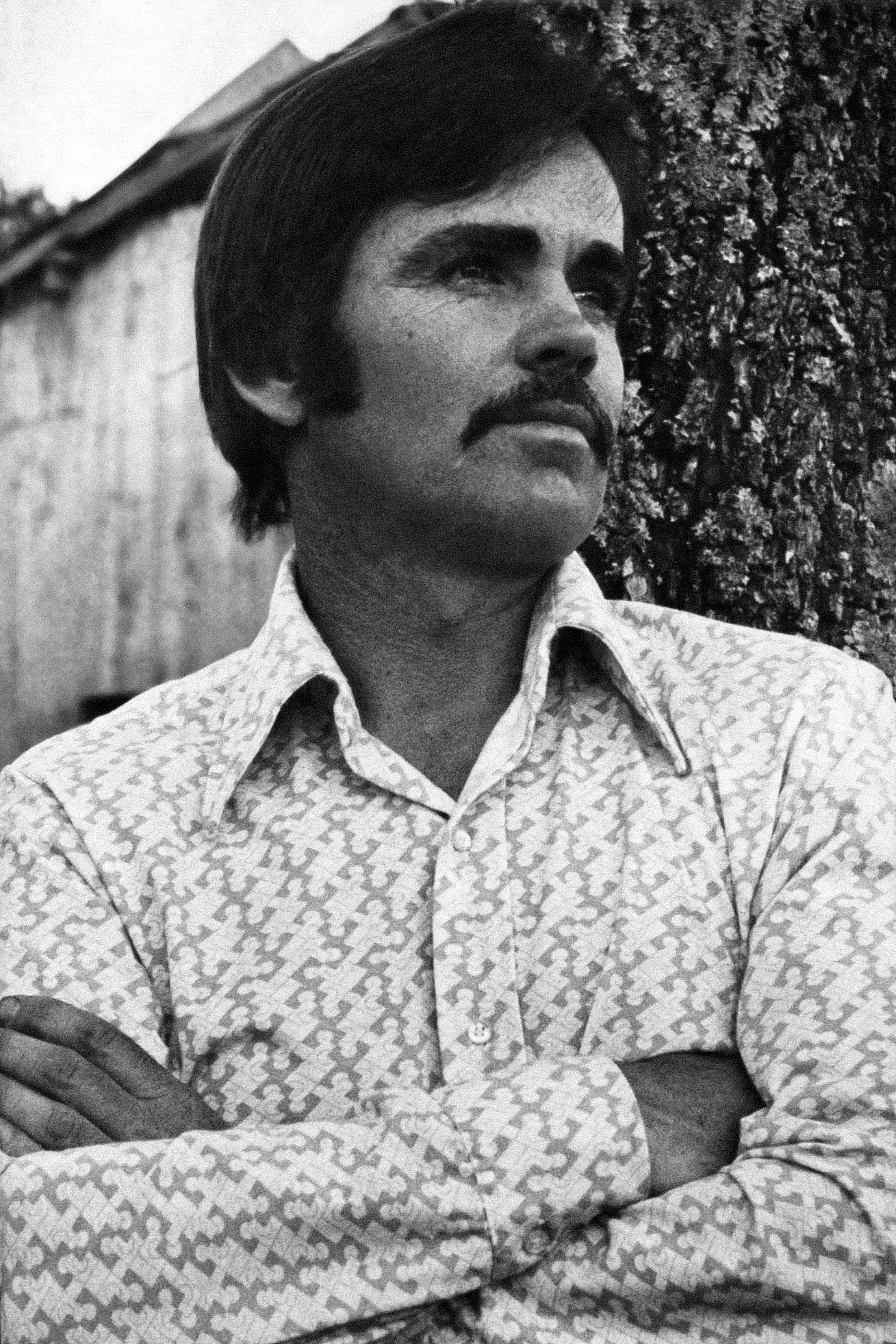
Cormac McCarthy

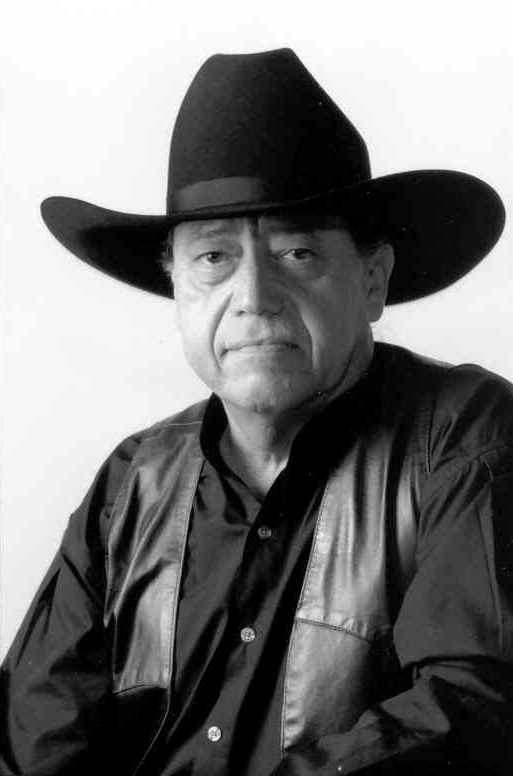
John Nieto

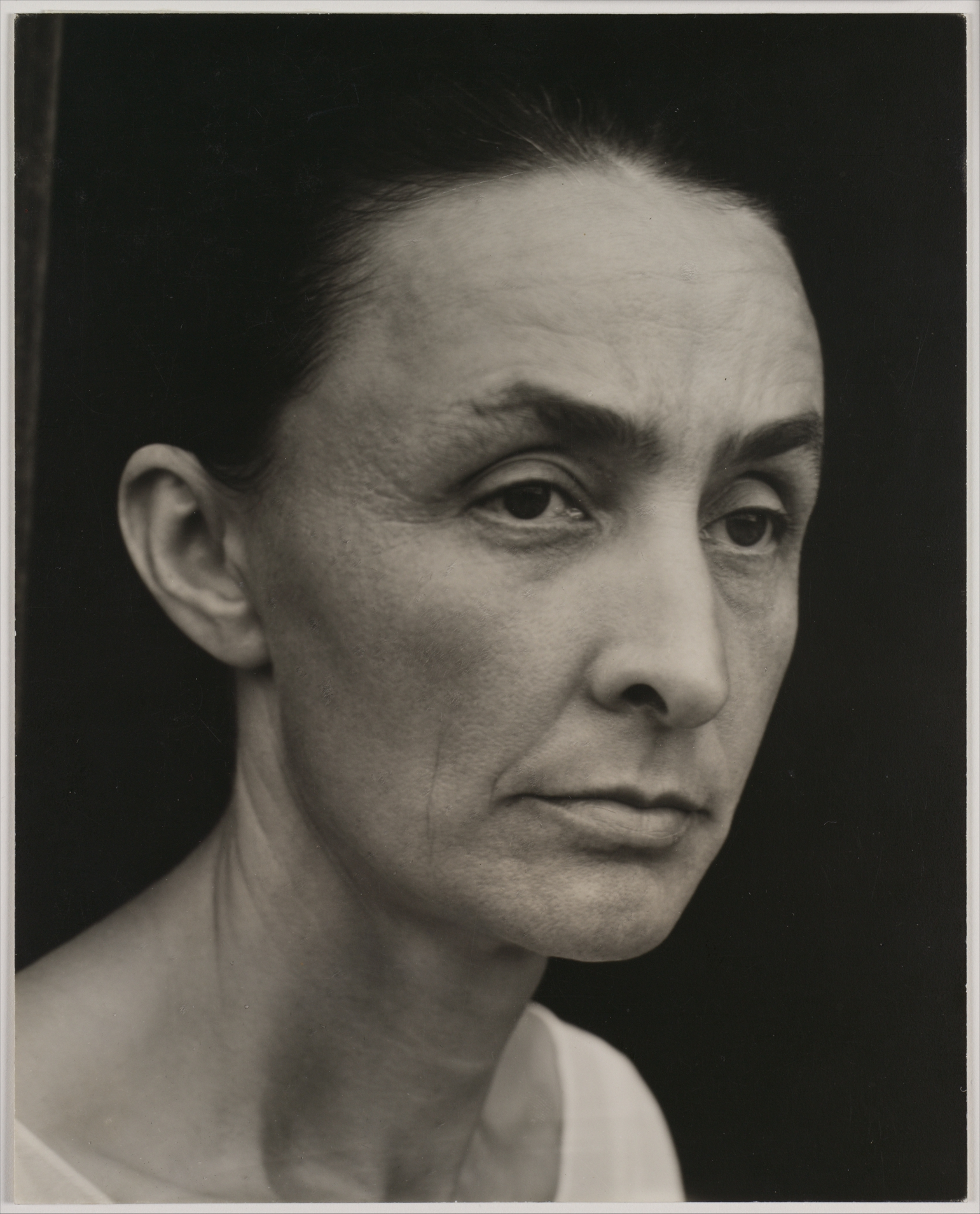
Georgia O'Keeffe

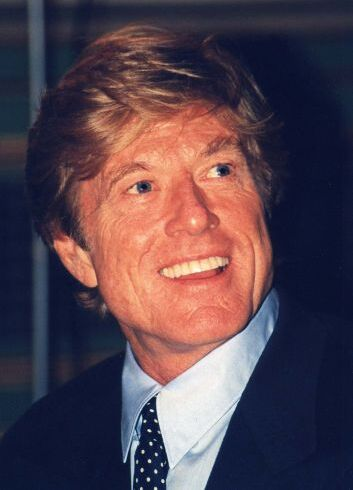
Robert Redford

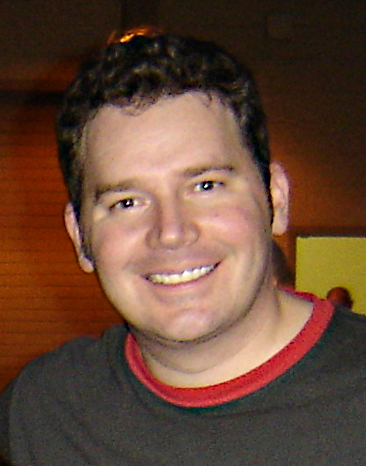
Brad Sherwood

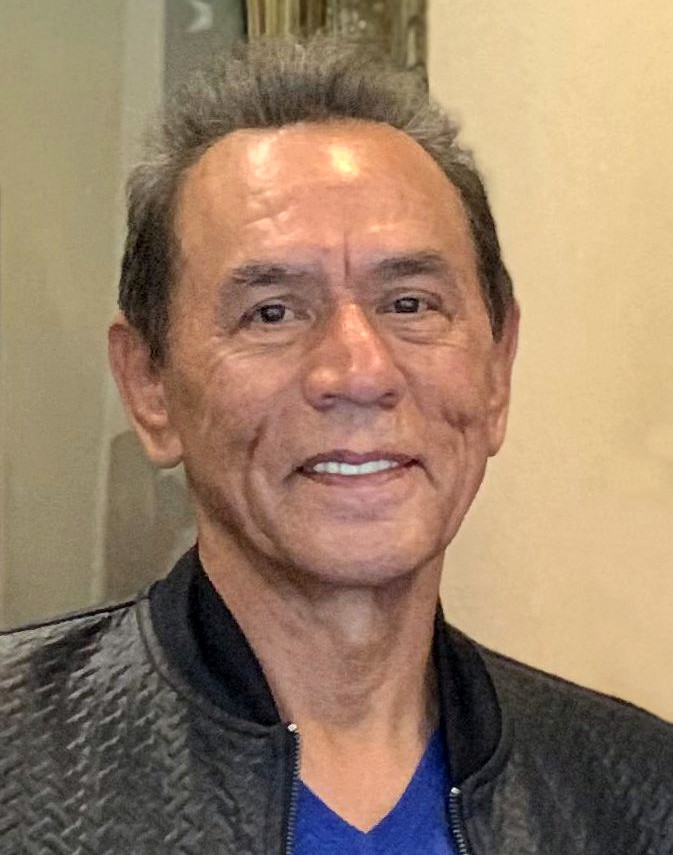
Wes Studi

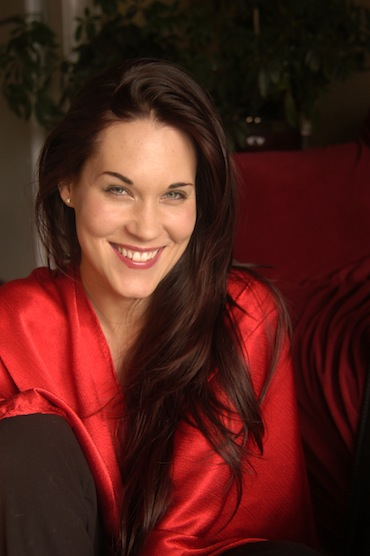
Teal Swan

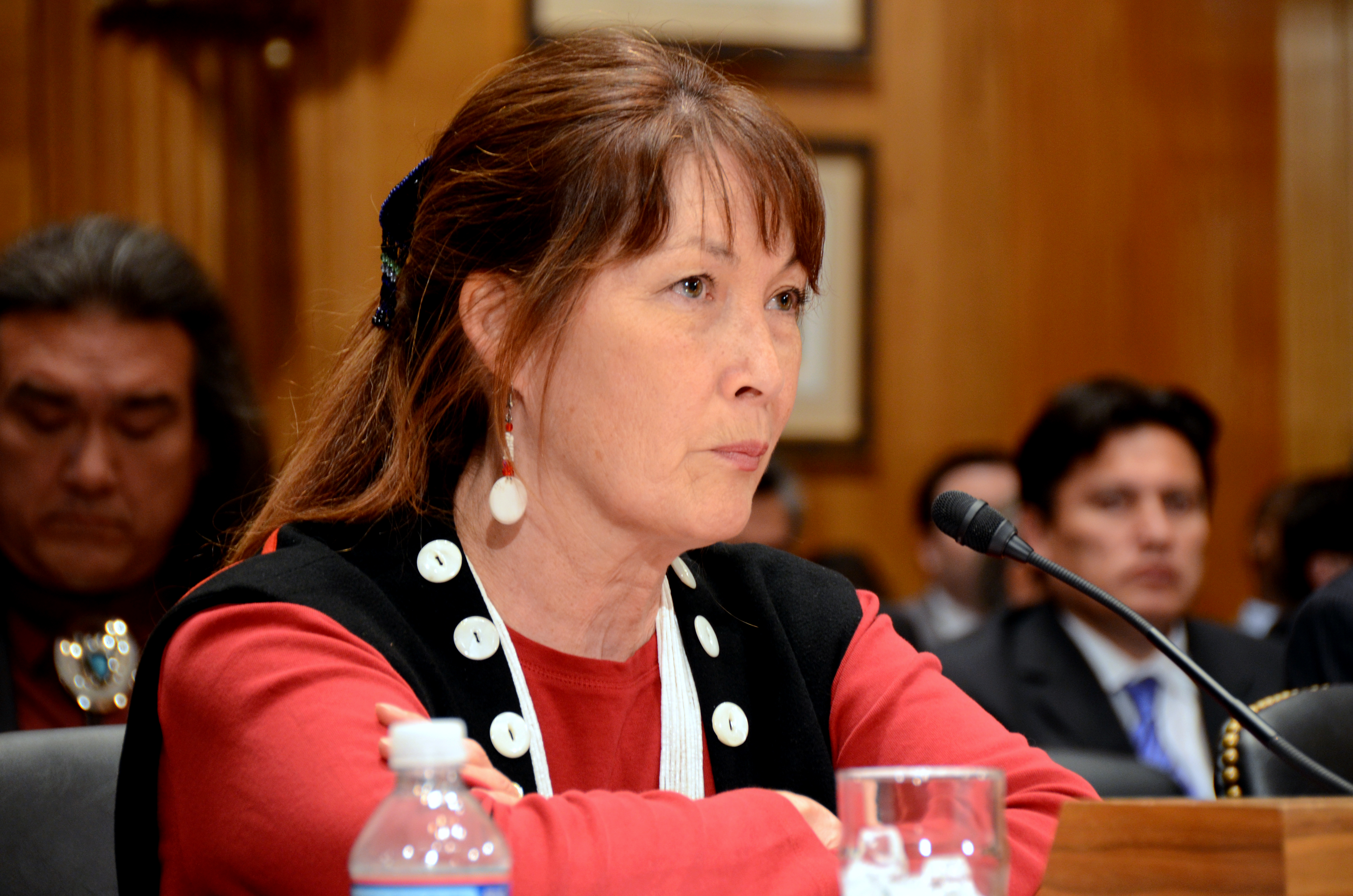
Charlene Teters

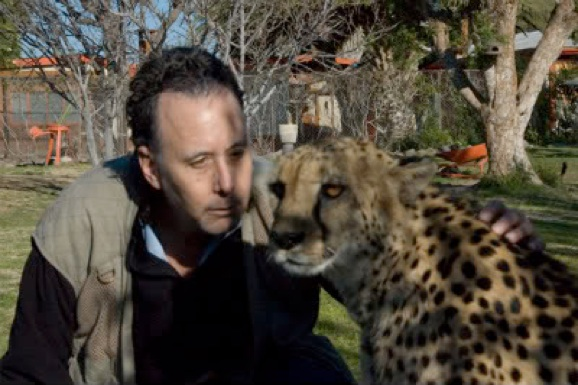
Michael Tobias

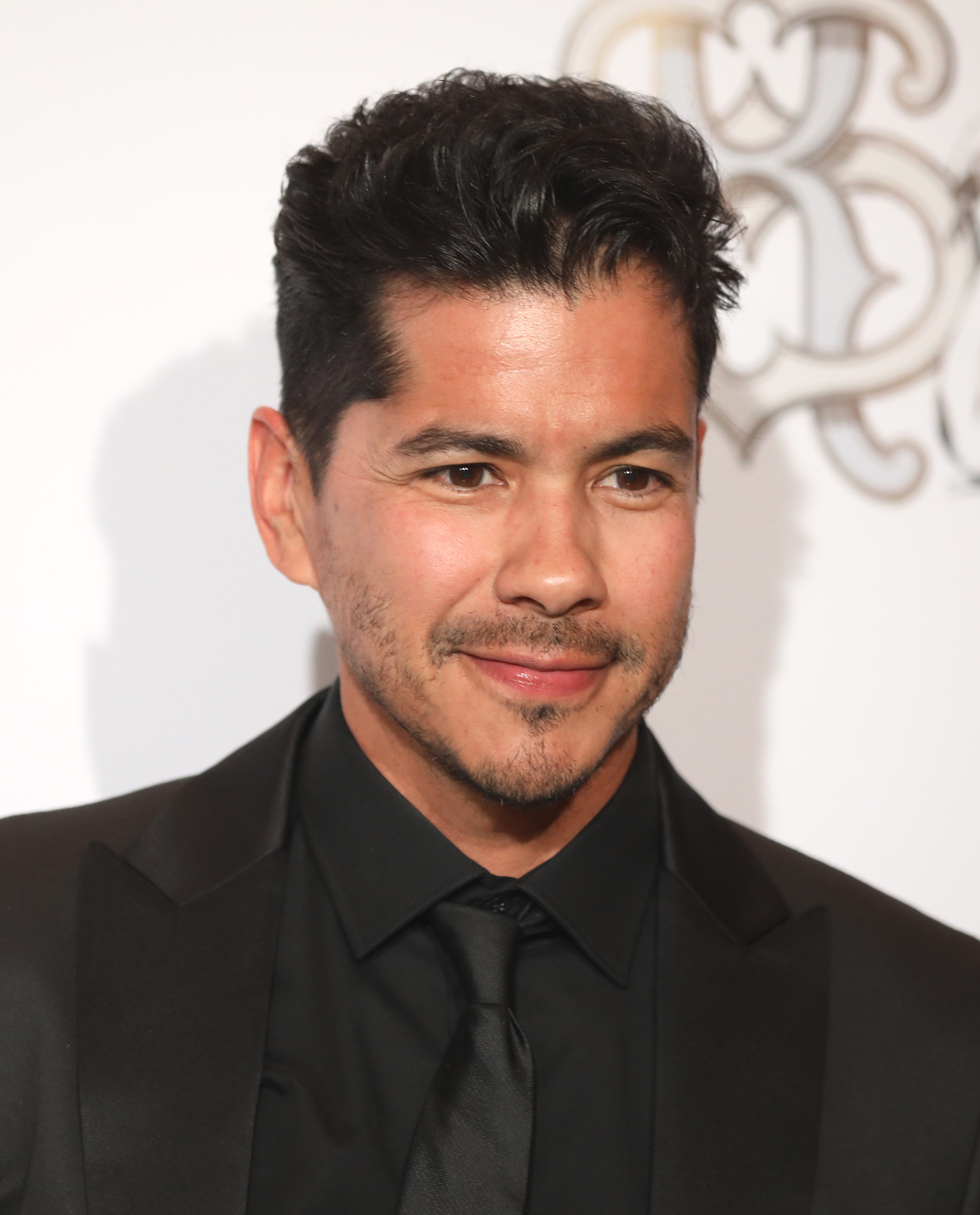
Jeremy Ray Valdez

== Arts and entertainment ==
- Mary Hunter Austin (1868–1934), writer
- Jimmy Santiago Baca (born 1952), poet
- Gustave Baumann (1881–1971), print-maker, marionette-maker and painter; resident artist for more than fifty years; died in Santa Fe
- William Berra (born 1952), painter
- Florence Birdwell (1924–2021), musician, teacher
- Ned Bittinger (born 1951), portrait painter and illustrator
- Merrill Brockway (1923–2013), Emmy Award-winning producer, director
- Dana Tai Soon Burgess (born 1968), dancer, choreographer
- Paul Burlin (1886–1969), modern and abstract expressionist painter
- Witter Bynner (1881–1968), poet
- Julia Cameron (1948), author of The Artist's Way
- Dana B. Chase (1848–1897), photographer
- Zach Condon (born 1986), lead singer and songwriter of band Beirut
- Randall Davey, painter and art educator
- Chris Eyre (born 1968), actor, director
- Tom Ford (born 1961), fashion designer
- T. Charles Gaastra (1879–1947), architect in the Pueblo Revival Style
- Greer Garson (1904–1996), actress and philanthropist
- Laura Gilpin (1891–1979), photographer and author
- Anna Gunn (born 1968), Emmy-winning actress
- Gene Hackman (1930-2025), Oscar-winning actor
- Dorothy B. Hughes (1904–1993), novelist and literary critic
- Martha Hyer (1924-2014), actress and screenwriter
- John Brinckerhoff Jackson (1909–1996), landscape architect
- Jeffe Kennedy, author
- Matt King, artist, co-founder of Meow Wolf
- Jean Kraft (1927–2021), operatic singer (mezzo-soprano)
- Oliver La Farge (1901–1963), writer
- Marjorie Herrera Lewis (born 1957), author
- Ali MacGraw (born 1939), actress
- Shirley MacLaine (born 1934), actress
- George R. R. Martin (born 1948), author and screenwriter, Game of Thrones
- Cormac McCarthy (1933–2023), author, winner of Pulitzer Prize for Fiction
- Christine McHorse (1948–2021), ceramic artist
- John Gaw Meem (1894–1983), architect who popularized the Pueblo Revival style
- John Nieto (1936–2018), contemporary artist
- Georgia O'Keeffe (1887–1986), artist, winner of National Medal of Arts
- Elliot Porter (1901–1990), photographer
- Robert Redford (1936–2025), actor, director
- Wendy Rule (born 1966) Australian-born musician
- Hib Sabin (born 1935), indigenous-style sculptor
- Brad Sherwood (born 1964), actor and comedian
- Wes Studi (born 1947), actor and musician
- Teal Swan (born 1984), spiritual guru and author
- Sheri S. Tepper (1929–2016), writer
- Charlene Teters (born 1952), artist, activist
- Michael Charles Tobias (born 1951), author and global ecologist
- Jeremy Ray Valdez (born 1980), actor
- Tuesday Weld (born 1943), actress
- Josh West (born 1977), Olympic medalist rower and Earth Sciences professor
- Roger Zelazny (1937–1995), writer
- Pinchas Zukerman (born 1948), violinist, conductor

== Military, politics, and public service ==
- David W. Alexander (1812–1886), Los Angeles politician and sheriff
- Bronson M. Cutting (1888–1935), politician, newspaper publisher and military attaché
- John Grubesic (born 1965), New Mexico State Senator, representing the 25th District as a Democrat
- Teresa Leger Fernández (born 1959), U.S. House of Representatives
- Ben Ray Luján (born 1972), U.S. senator for New Mexico
- Dorothy McKibbin (1897–1985), gatekeeper and point-of-contact for personnel at the Manhattan Project
- Jesse L. Nusbaum (1887–1975), archaeologist, anthropologist, photographer and National Park Service Superintendent
- L. Bradford Prince (1840–1922), Governor of New Mexico Territory
- Manuel de Sandoval, colonial governor of Texas, the only native of New Mexico to govern Spanish Texas
- Tom Udall (born 1948), former United States Senator from New Mexico (2009-2021) and former Ambassador of the United States to New Zealand and Samoa (2021-2025)
- Lew Wallace (1827–1905), territorial governor 1878–1881, and author of Ben-Hur
- Timothy E. Wirth, former U.S. Senator from Colorado and founding President of the United Nations Foundation, recipient of the UN Champions of the Earth Environmental Award

== Other ==
- Antonio Armijo (1804–1850), explorer and merchant who led the first commercial caravan between Santa Fe, Nuevo México and Los Angeles, Alta California in 1829–1830
- Garance Franke-Ruta (born 1972), journalist
- Murray Gell-Mann (1929–2019), theoretical physicist, Nobel Prize recipient
- Edgar Lee Hewett (1865–1946), archaeologist and anthropologist
- Jean-Baptiste Lamy (1814–1888), first Archbishop of Santa Fe
- Jean Baptiste LeLande (1778–1821), merchant
- Sylvanus Morley (1883–1948), archaeologist and Mayanist
- Stanisław Ulam (1909–1984), mathematician associated with the Manhattan Project

== See also ==
- List of St. John's College (Annapolis/Santa Fe) people
