= James Purcell (mountain man) =

American trapper and trader

James Purcell, also known by Zebulon Pike as James Pursley, (Note: In a newspaper article he wrote for the Missouri Intelligencer he spelled his name Purcell. It appears as his name was just spelled as Pursley by Pike.) was a hunter, trapper, and trader in the Louisiana Territory beginning in 1802. He traded with Native Americans in what is now Colorado and New Mexico until 1805 when he went to Santa Fe. Purcell was then a carpenter there until 1824.

== Early life ==
Purcell was raised in Kentucky. He left Bardstown, Kentucky (Bairdstown) in 1799, heading west.

== Hunter and trapper ==
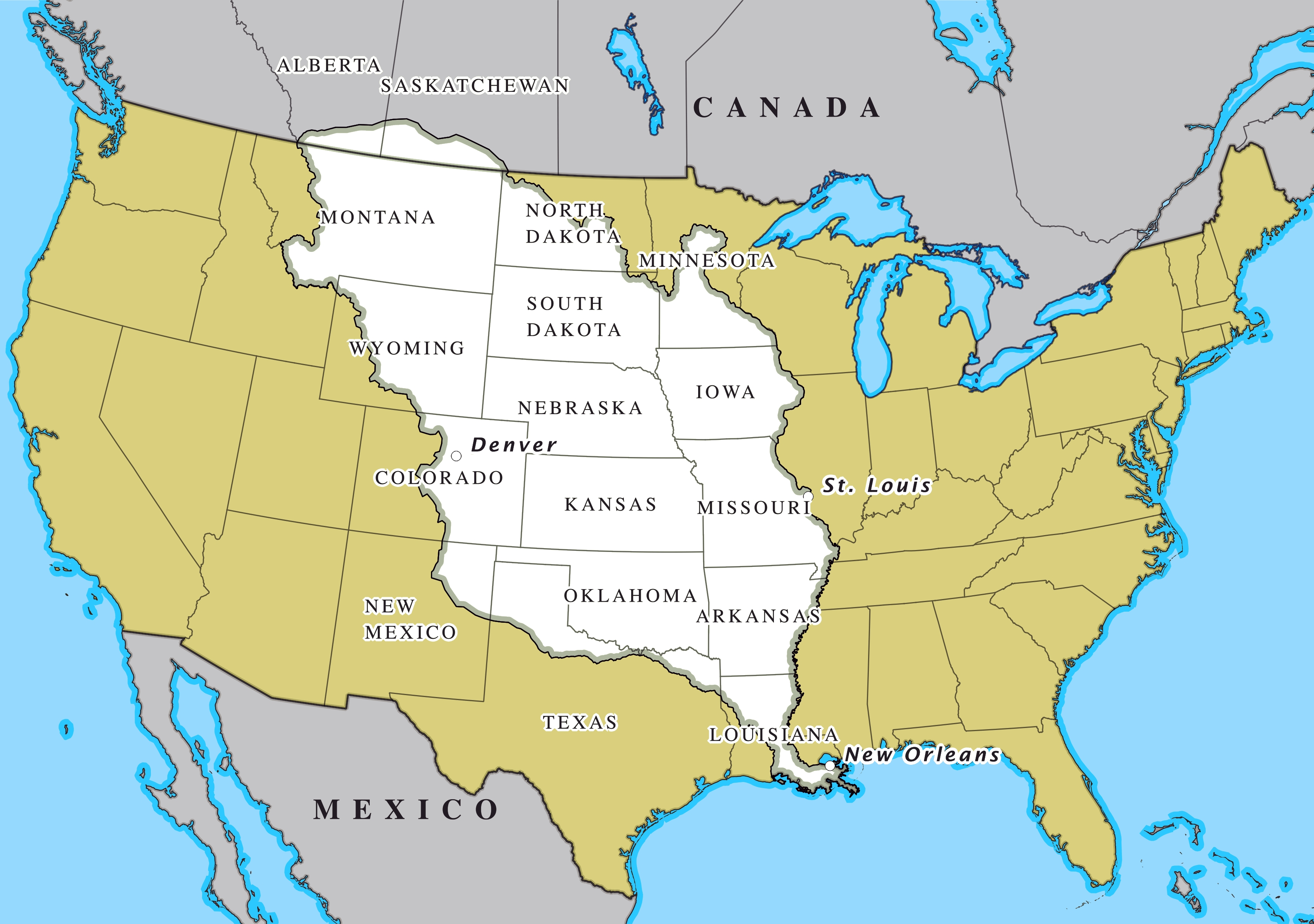
The United States government acquired the Louisiana Purchase in 1803

Purcell was in St. Louis in 1802 when he headed west along the Missouri River and then south in the wilderness of the western Louisiana Territory. He traveled with two other men to hunt with the Osage Nation. In 1802, they were near the Osage River when they got into a skirmish with a Native American tribe in present-day Kansas. The three men trapped on the headwaters of the Osage River had several incidents with Native Americans, including Kanza and other people, they lost their horses. Some Kanza people stole their furs. Another time they lost their furs while paddling an improvised canoe on the Osage or Missouri River. Purcell's fellow trappers returned to their homes. Purcell met up with another explorer who was headed up the Missouri River to trade with members of the Mandan tribe. (Note: Baker and Hafen state that Purcell was driven from the Great Plains by the Sioux.)

Purcell lived in the plains and the mountains of Colorado for three years. In 1803 and 1804, Purcell hunted and traded along the headwaters of the Arkansas River (near Leadville, Colorado). He is also said to have lived in South Park and, for three years, lived along the South Platte River in what is now Brighton, Colorado. The area is now the city of Brighton, Colorado. He worked as a trapper and traded with Native Americans, like the Kiowa and Comanche. Purcell, one of the early trappers in Colorado, generally trapped beaver. He was sent south to the Platte Rivery Valley in early 1805 to trade with Native Americans.

He was then sent to Santa Fe in June 1805 to facilitate trading with Native Americans, or to get permission to trade in Spanish lands in the South West. He decided to stay in Santa Fe and the Native Americans who he traveled with relayed the approval to trade in Spanish settlements (south of the Arkansas River). He worked in Santa Fe as a carpenter. During that time, he was prevented from writing and his movements were monitored. In 1824, a James Purcell stated that he lived in New Mexico for 19 years.

While in Santa Fe, Purcell met Zebulon Pike, who considered Purcell the "first American who ever penetrated the immense wilds of Louisiana toward the west." In 1807, Purcell told Pike that he had found gold along the headwaters of the South Platte River (South Park). Pike later published the story. Prospectors traveled along the Santa Fe Trail and the Overland Trail to make their way to Colorado. Placer gold deposits were subsequently found in South Park.

Purcell met Jean Baptiste LeLande in South Park when he was traveling with 2,000 Native Americans. LeLande was hired by William Morrison of Kaskaskia to trade with Native Americans in the west and Santa Fe. LeLande made it into Colorado and to Santa Fe about 1803.

According to historian Hiram M. Chittenden in his book American Fur Trade of the Far West, Purcell was the first recorded American in Colorado.

== Bibliography ==
- Baker, James H.; LeRoy R. Hafen, eds. (1927). History of Colorado. Vol. 1. Denver, Colorado: Linderman Company.
- Chittenden, Hiram Martin (1902). The American Fur Trade of the Far West: A History of the Pioneer Trading Posts and Early Fur Companies of the Missouri Valley and the Rocky Mountains and of the Overland Commerce with Santa Fe. F.P. Harper.
