= Gervais Nolan =

French Canadian fur trader (1796–1857)

Gervais Nolan (June 19, 1796 – January 27, 1857) was a 19th-century French Canadian fur trapper, businessman and real estate magnate prominent in the American Southwest. Born Gervais Nolin near the turn of the 19th century in St-Charles-de-Bellechasse, Canada, little is known of his early life except that he worked for the Montreal-based Northwest Fur Company, joining them in 1816. He traveled to Fort William on Lake Superior and may have spent the 1818–1819 season in Athabasca. He left Canada with a group of merchants in 1820.

By 1824 Gervasio Nolan made Taos, New Mexico his home where he worked as a gunsmith. On August 5, 1828, he married Maria Dolores Lalande, the twelve-year-old daughter of Jean Baptiste LeLande, a French Creole mountain man who in 1804 was the first American to establish commercial contact with Santa Fe. Between 1829 and 1845, Gervais and Maria Dolores Lalande had 8 children together. In 1827, Nolan traveled from Taos to Missouri and back again with a group of fur traders. When naturalization requirements were eased in 1828, Nolan was one of the first foreigners to request Mexican citizenship. His new status as a Mexican citizen allowed him to freely trap and trade in Spanish territory, and legally engage in trade with foreign nationals, including Americans. In the winter of 1830–31, he went on a trapping expedition with a group of Mexican citizens.

In the 1830s, Nolan shifted to mining, business and land acquisition. He opened a store and forge in the mining town of Real del Oro and acquired a small fortune by mining and commerce. In 1843, he was awarded 800,000 acres (3,200 km^{2}) in the San Carlos River valley of southern Colorado. He hired staff and placed much of the land under cultivation. In 1845, Nolan obtained another 600,000 acres (2,400 km^{2}) near the Red River. In 1850, still adventurous, Nolan and his son Fernando went to Marysville, California in search of gold. He returned to his New Mexico holdings and died there in 1857. (Hafan, p. 195–199)
