= List of people from Annapolis, Maryland =

This is a list of people who were born in, lived in, or are closely associated with the city of Annapolis, Maryland.

== Athletics ==
- Matai Akinmboni (2006–), soccer player
- LaVar Arrington II (2007–), football player
- Devin Barclay (1983–), professional soccer and college football player
- Bill Belichick (1952–), lived in Annapolis, graduate of Annapolis High School, head football coach at the University of North Carolina, former head coach of the New England Patriots
- Donald Brown (1963–), pro football player
- Lacey Eden (2002-) Women’s professional hockey player, 4 time NCAA champion
- Daronte Jones, American football coach
- Ivan Leshinsky (born 1947), American-Israeli basketball player
- Debbie Meyer (1952–), born in Annapolis, three-time Olympic swimming gold medalist
- Travis Pastrana, X Games athlete, Nitro Circus / Nitro Rallycross founder and 5x American Rally Association / Rally America Champion
- Mark Teixeira (1980–), born in Annapolis, retired professional baseball player for New York Yankees

== Arts & Entertainment ==
- John Henry Alexander (1812–1867), born in Annapolis, scientist, businessman, and author
- John Beale Bordley (1727–1804), government official, farmer, and author
- James M. Cain (1892–1977), born in Annapolis, author of Double Indemnity, Mildred Pierce and The Postman Always Rings Twice
- Michele Carey (1942–2018), born in Annapolis, actress, El Dorado, Live a Little, Love a Little
- Robert Duvall, actor, lived in downtown Annapolis
- Jay Fleming, born in Annapolis, photographer
- Barbara Kingsolver (1955–), born in Annapolis, novelist and poet
- Iris Krasnow (1954–), author, journalism professor, and keynote speaker
- Louise Platt (1915–2003), theater, film, and TV actress, grew up in Annapolis
- Christian Siriano, fashion designer and winner of the fourth season of Project Runway
- Thorne Smith (1892–1934), author of Topper
- Stan Stearns (1935−2012), photographer of the iconic image of a three-year-old John F. Kennedy Jr. saluting the coffin of his father, U.S. President John F. Kennedy
- Leo Strauss (1899–1973), German-born Jewish political philosopher who specialized in the study of classical philosophy; spent his last three years of life teaching at St. John's in Annapolis

== Military, politics, & public service ==
- James D. Beans, born in Annapolis, graduate of United States Naval Academy; later brigadier general in the Marine Corps
- Sally Brice-O'Hara (born 1953), graduate of Annapolis High school, 27th vice-commandant of the U.S. Coast Guard
- Charles Carroll (1723–1783), Continental Congressman from Maryland
- Charles Carroll of Carrollton (1737–1832), United States senator and signer of United States Declaration of Independence
- Pamela Chelgren-Koterba (born 1950), former officer of the NOAA Commissioned Officer Corps
- Peter K. Cullins (1928–2012), U.S. Navy admiral
- Evelyn O. A. Darden, civil rights lawyer
- Henry Winter Davis (1817–1865), United States representative from Maryland
- Sarah Elfreth (born 1988), United States congresswoman, former Maryland state senator
- Jon Eubanks, Republican member of Arkansas House of Representatives from Logan County; graduated from high school in Annapolis
- John Hall (1729–1797), born in Annapolis, delegate to the Continental Congress from Maryland
- Alexander Contee Hanson (1786–1819), born in Annapolis, United States congressman and senator from Maryland
- Samuel M. Harrington (1882–1948), born in Annapolis, USMC brigadier general
- Reverdy Johnson (1796–1876), born in Annapolis, United States senator from Maryland and attorney general of the United States
- Frank J. Larkin, resident of Annapolis, 40th sergeant at arms of the United States Senate
- James Booth Lockwood (1852–1884), born in Annapolis, army officer and Arctic explorer; the person who named Lockwood Island
- George K. McGunnegle, U.S. Army colonel
- William Duhurst Merrick (1818–1889), born in Annapolis, lawyer, professor at George Washington University, and United States senator from Maryland
- Harold Blaine Miller, U.S. Navy official, Eisenhower appointee, pilot, public relations executive, college administrator, and author
- William Paca (1740–1799), signatory to the United States Declaration of Independence as a representative of Maryland
- Reginald H. Ridgely Jr., United States Marine Corps lieutenant general; grew up in Annapolis
- Henry D. Todd, United States Naval Academy professor and rear admiral
- Blake Van Leer, resident during WWII, U.S. Army colonel and board member of United States Naval Academy

== Other ==
- Brother Chidananda (1953–), president of the Self-Realization Fellowship and Yogada Satsang Society of India
- Amy Richter, Episcopal priest
- Anne St. Clair Wright (1910–1993), long-time Annapolis resident; historic preservationist in the city

== See also ==
- List of St. John's College (Annapolis/Santa Fe) people
