= Harold Geneen =

American businessman

- Born: Harold Sydney Geneen; January 22, 1910; Bournemouth, Hampshire, England
- Died: November 21, 1997 (aged 87); New York City
- Occupation: Businessman
- Employer(s): Raytheon; ITT Corporation
- Known for: CEO of ITT Corporation

Harold "Hal" Sydney Geneen (January 22, 1910 – November 21, 1997), was an American businessman most famous for serving as president of the ITT Corporation.

== Biography ==
Geneen was born on January 22, 1910, in Bournemouth, Hampshire, England. His father was Russian-Jewish, and his mother was an Italian Roman Catholic. He migrated to the United States from England as an infant and later studied accounting at New York University. Between 1956 and 1959 he was senior vice president of Raytheon, developing his management structure, allowing a large degree of freedom for divisions while maintaining a high degree of financial and other accountability, which was surprising as he had been ejected from his prior employer, Jones and Laughlin Steel Company, for reckless management of the company books.

From 1959 to 1977 he was the president and CEO of International Telephone and Telegraph Corp. (ITT). He grew the company from a medium-sized business with $765 million sales in 1961 into an international conglomerate with $17 billion sales in 1970. He extended its interests from manufacturing of telegraph equipment into insurance, hotels, real estate management, and other areas. Under Geneen's management, ITT became the archetypal modern multinational conglomerate. ITT grew primarily through a series of approximately 350 acquisitions and mergers in 80 countries. Some of the largest of these were Hartford Fire Insurance Company (1970) and Sheraton Hotels.

ITT had many overseas interests. In Europe it had telephone subsidiaries in numerous countries. In Brazil, it owned a telephone company that would be nationalised by President João Goulart.

ITT also had some $200 million-worth of investments in Chile. Under Geneen's leadership, ITT funneled $350,000 to Allende's opponent, Jorge Alessandri. When Allende won the presidential election, ITT offered the CIA $1,000,000 to defeat Allende, though the offer was rejected. Declassified documents released by the CIA in 2000 reveal that ITT financially helped opponents of Salvador Allende's government prepare a military coup. On September 28, 1973, an ITT building in New York City, New York, was bombed by the Weather Underground for involvement in the September 11 overthrow of the Allende government.

In 1977 Geneen retired as CEO and president of ITT, was chairman of the board until 1979, and stayed on the board for four more years. While chairman, he recruited James H. Frame from IBM as vice-president to head ITT's software division. His successors, particularly Rand Araskog, steadily sold off parts of the business.

In his obituary, The New York Times stated that he remained active in business and on the boards of several educational institutes until his death, and had said "his post-retirement deal-making had earned him far more than he ever made at ITT."

Geneen's widow, June Geneen, born in Berlin, New Hampshire, died in Boston in October 2012.

== Books ==
Harold Geneen wrote and co-authored several books:

- Geneen, Harold; Brent Bowers (1999). Synergy and Other Lies: Downsizing, Bureaucracy, and Corporate Culture Debunked. New York: St. Martin's Griffin. ISBN 0-312-20080-3.
- Geneen, Harold; Brent Bowers (1997). The Synergy Myth and Other Ailments Of Business Today. New York: St. Martin's Press. ISBN 0-312-14724-4.
- Geneen, Harold; Alvin Moscow (1986). Alta Dirección: Las Normas Básicas Para Triunfar en los Negocios. Barcelona: Ediciones Grijalbo. ISBN 84-253-1871-8.
- Geneen, Harold; Alvin Moscow (1984). Managing. Garden City, NY: Doubleday. ISBN 0-385-17496-9.

There have been several books written about Geneen's time at ITT, and at least one about Geneen himself.

- Schoenberg, Robert J. (1985), Geneen, W. W. Norton & Company.
