= John Nieto =

American contemporary artist (1936–2018)

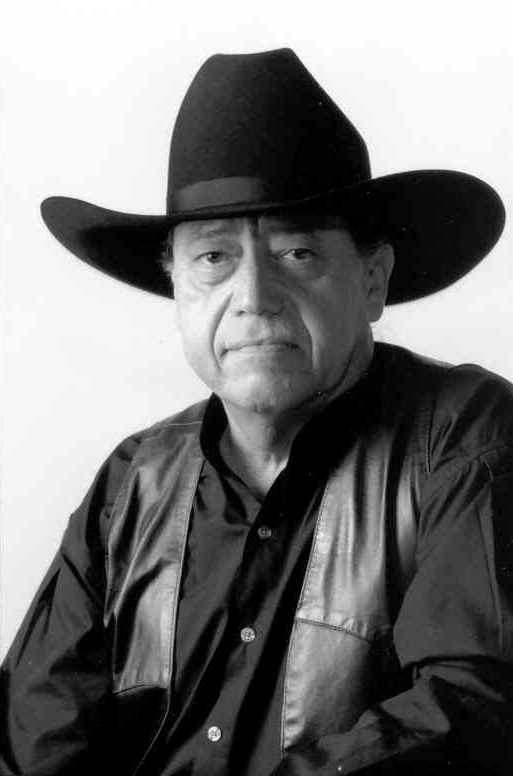
- Born: 1936; Denver, Colorado
- Died: 2018 (aged 81–82)
- Citizenship: American
- Education: Southern Methodist University (BFA)
- Known for: painting
- Website: nietofineart.com

John Nieto (1936–2018) was an American painter who concentrated on Native American themes and wildlife from the Western United States. He was a longtime resident of Santa Fe, New Mexico.

== Biography ==
John Wesley Nieto was born in Denver, Colorado in 1936. He was the third oldest of 14 children born to Natalia Venegas Nieto and Simon Nieto. His father worked for the U.S. Office of Censorship during World War II and later became a Methodist minister. Nieto's work reflects his Mexican-American ancestry. He earned a BFA degree from Southern Methodist University in University Park, Texas, in 1959.

== Identity ==
John Nieto claimed to have been of Mescalero Apache descent; however, as art historian Julie R. Sasse wrote: "The Mescalero Apache Tribe took the matter under consideration and after a tribal vote, declared unconditionally that Nieto was not a tribal member and was not known to have any Mescalero relatives." Because Nieto was not an enrolled tribal member, he could no longer claim to be a Native American artist after the passage of the 1990 Indian Arts and Crafts Act. After "protests by the members of the Native-American community," Nieto changed his claims of being a Mescalero Apache artist to having "mixed Indian and Spanish blood" or "Hispanic and American Indian ancestry."

== Work and recognition ==
Nieto presented his painting “Delegate to the White House” to President Reagan in the Oval Office of the White House. which hung during the President’s term in office and later included in the presidential library.

In 2002 his painting Buffalo Dancer was installed in the Albuquerque International Sunport’s Great Hall.

In 1994 Nieto received the New Mexico Governor's Award for Achievement in the Arts. He served on the Advisory Boards for both the Wheelwright Museum and the Native American Preparatory School.

Nieto is represented in the New Mexico Museum of Fine Arts in Santa Fe.

=== Public collections ===
- New Mexico Museum of Fine Art Santa Fe, NM
- Permanent collection, Marine Corp Museum Washington, DC
- Heard Museum Phoenix, AZ
- Capital Art Foundation Santa Fe, NM
