= William Berra =

American painter

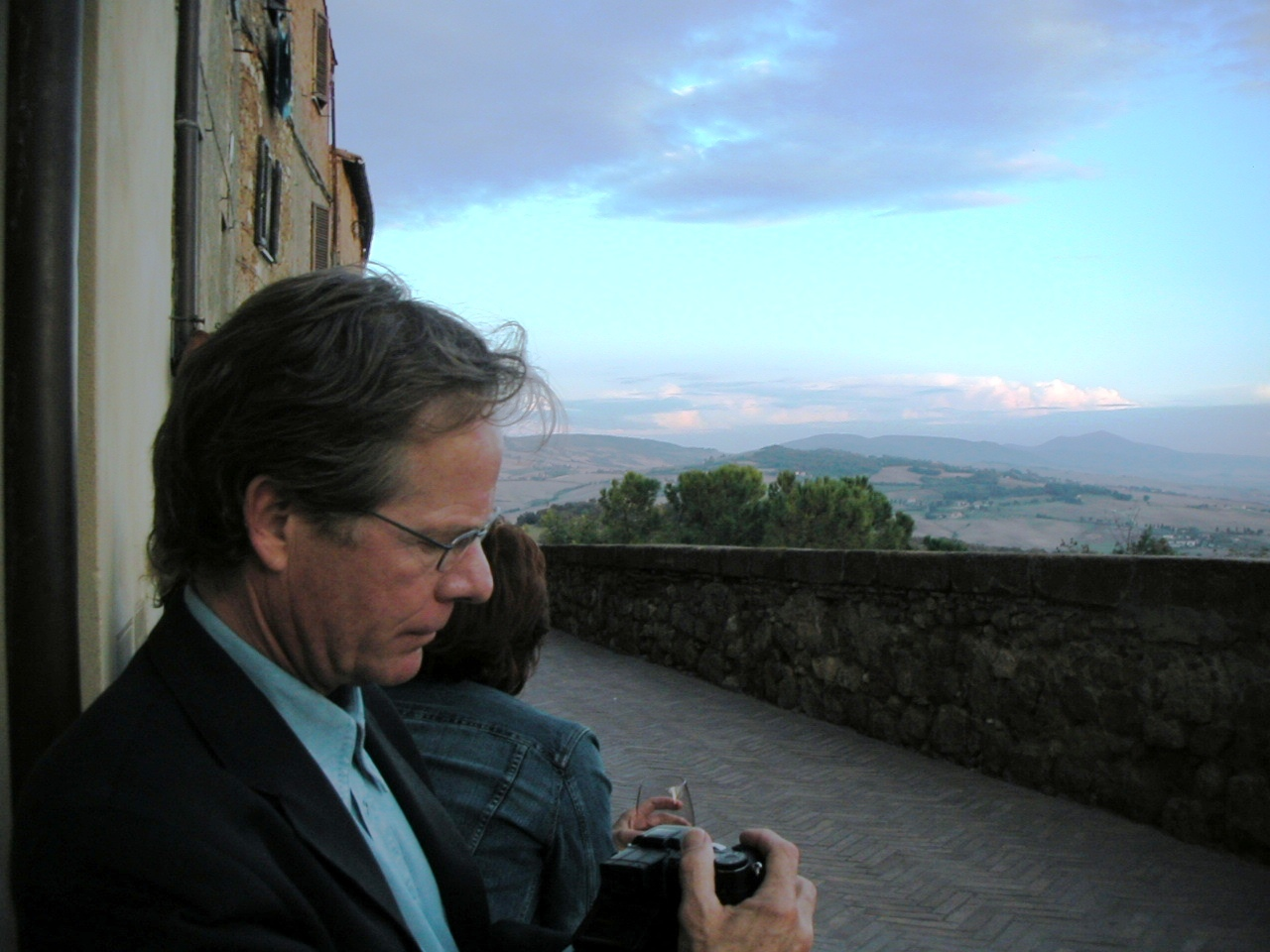
- Born: 1952 (age 73–74); York, Pennsylvania
- Occupation: Painter
- Spouse: Alanna C. Burke

William Berra is an American painter of landscapes, figures, and still life. He is represented by galleries throughout the United States and his work is in many public and private collections. Berra has appeared in over 40 solo and group shows. William Berra lives in the foothills of the Sangre de Cristo Mountains north of Santa Fe with his wife, Alanna C. Burke, who is his business partner and a frequent model in his paintings.

== Early life ==
In 1952, Berra was born in York, Pennsylvania. As a child he constantly sketched and painted. By adolescence he was copying the Neo-Classic painters and old masters, and he supplemented high school with classes at the York Academy of Art.

Berra attended the Maryland Institute College of Art.

== Career ==
Berra traveled throughout North America, capturing the landscape in studies painted en plein air. In 1976 Berra arrived in Santa Fe, New Mexico. He was dazzled by the landscape and the clarity of the high desert light, and stayed to paint it. His work was chosen for the 1978 Biennial Exhibition at the New Mexico Museum of Art. Jean Seth, owner of Seth's Canyon Road Art Gallery, saw the exhibition and offered him a show and representation. William Berra's career as a professional artist was born.

Berra spent the 1980s primarily painting Northern New Mexico en plein air. He was influenced by the Macchiaioli painters of 19th century Italy, precursors to the French practitioners of Impressionism, and he experimented with techniques to achieve their effects. One technique was that of painting on a board shellacked with an orange base. The undercoating generally warms the painting, showing through where oil paint is applied sparingly. He also placed "complementary hues side by side for maximum visual vibration."

In the 1990s, Berra began to spend more time painting in the studio, developing material gathered in plein air sketches and photographs. He expanded his horizons and his subject matter, traveling and painting landscapes in Europe, Hawaii, and throughout North America. Italy became a favorite subject. In one project, Berra spent time in Rome seeking out views painted in the mid-19th century by a favorite artist, Jean-Baptiste-Camille Corot, and other plein air painters of Grand Tour subjects. The paintings from this project were the subject of a solo exhibition in 2001.

Berra also turned his attention increasingly to figurative work. Starting with oil sketches of his wife painted on location in Europe, he developed a style that presents ambiguous figures in abstract, unresolved landscapes. He began an ongoing series of beach scenes that have become increasingly simplified and abstracted in recent years. His nude series presents a female figure either in intimate domestic settings or on utterly abstracted backgrounds.

Berra continues to paint landscapes of Europe, both city (Venice, Paris, London, etc.) and country (Tuscany, Provence, Santorini, Mykonos, etc.). The Hawaiian Islands' dramatic scenery and weather inspire atmospheric landscape paintings. Northern New Mexico is also a subject.

Throughout Berra's career, he has produced occasional still life paintings using the same approach that he uses in his figurative paintings: he simplifies the motif and presents it on an abstracted background. Many of his works, whatever the subject, use negative space to isolate the subject.

Berra also continues to develop his beach scenes and figurative paintings. He said this about a painting from his Diving Platform series: "I've been painting landscapes, beach scenes and figurative work for decades. Diving Platform, Dusk includes elements from them all: the reflective water, the evening sky, the figures. This painting represents a new phase in my figurative work. Elements that I've long worked with are combined in different ways. The atmosphere of the sunset sky and the way it reflects in the water gives a mood to the figures." A 2023 show at the Montgomery Museum of Fine Arts entitled A Luminist's Vision, The Paintings of William Berra, provides a retrospective of many of Berra's motifs.

Of Berra's latest work, Nedra Matteucci of Nedra Matteucci Galleries, Santa Fe, says "His paintings have new depth, from surprising figurative work to landscapes that contrast both the familiar and uncommon. His current varied technique and style in oil, with some on gold-colored metal leaf, create exciting paintings of people, birds, cattle, and colorful vistas near and far."

== In popular culture ==
In 2008, Stephen King included references to William Berra paintings in his book Duma Key.

== Additional sources ==
- Allison, Lesli. "Panorama of Light, Shadow in an Ever-Changing Landscape." Santa Fe New Mexican, Pasatiempo, July 4, 1991.
- Boggs, Johnny D. "William Berra: Motivation and Motif." Western Art and Architecture, October/November 2012.
- Campbell, Suzan and Deats, Suzanne. Landscapes of New Mexico: Paintings of the Land of Enchantment. Albuquerque, New Mexico; Fresco Fine Art Publications, 2006.
- Cauble, Dianne. "Rediscovering the Human Spirit." Focus Santa Fe, November/December 1999.
- Clawson, Michael. "William Berra: Inspired by Nature." American Art Collector, June 2017.
- Clawson, Michael. "William Berra: Pristine Skies." Western Art Collector, June 2017.
- Cline, Lynn. "Bill Berra Finds and Paints a Sense of Place." Santa Fe New Mexican, Pasatiempo, November 28, 1997.
- Eauclaire, Sally. "Celebrating the Land." Southwest Profile, August 1990.
- Editors of American Art Collector. "The New Tuscan Landscapes of William Berra Leave Something to the Imagination." American Art Collector, December 2005.
- Editors of American Art Collector. "William Berra: Artist Chooses to Visually Simplify Complex Subjects to Help Viewers Connect with these Paintings." American Art Collector, May 2006.
- Editors of American Art Collector. "William Berra: Chance Encounters." American Art Collector, April 2008.
- Editors of American Art Collector. "International Masters." American Art Collector, October 2010.
- Editors of American Art Collector. "William Berra: Broad Motifs." American Art Collector, November 2012.
- Fauntleroy, Gussie. "The Best of Both Worlds." Southwest Art, May 2000.
- Fauntleroy, Gussie. "Show Preview, Au Naturel." Southwest Art, October 2012.
- Fowler, Kathryne and Stem, Nancy N. New Mexico Millennium Collection: A Twenty-First Century Celebration of Fine Art in New Mexico. Tesuque, New Mexico; The New Mexico Millennium Collection LLC, 2001.
- Glenn, Reed. "A Breath of Plein Air." Southwest Art, August 2010.
- Jarvis, John. "Simply Better." Art-Talk, August/September 2002.
- King, Stephen. Duma Key. New York, New York; Scribner, 2008.
- Kipp, Kathryn (editor). Art Journey America Landscapes: 89 Painters' Perspectives. Cincinnati, Ohio; North Light Books, 2012.
- Markle, Jamie and Collector's Guide Editors. Art Journey: New Mexico (104 Painters' Perspectives). Cincinnati, Ohio; The Collector's Guide, F+W Media Inc., 2009.
- Murphy, Joy Waldron. "Bill Berra." Southwest Art, November 1990.
- Oakton, Bill. "Up the Canyons and Down the Rivers." Focus Santa Fe, June/July 1988.
- Rintala, Laura. "William Berra." Southwest Art, June 2017.
- Smith, Craig. "Summer Countries." Santa Fe New Mexican, Pasatiempo cover article August 29, 2003.
- Watson, Lisa Crawford. "Artist William Berra Makes Statements, Simply Said with a Plein-Air Style." Monterey County Herald, September 19–25, 2002.
- Wissman, Pamela and Stefanie Laufersweiler. Sketchbook Confidential: Secrets from the private sketches of over 40 master artists. Cincinnati, Ohio; North Light Books, 2010.
