= Jeffe Kennedy =

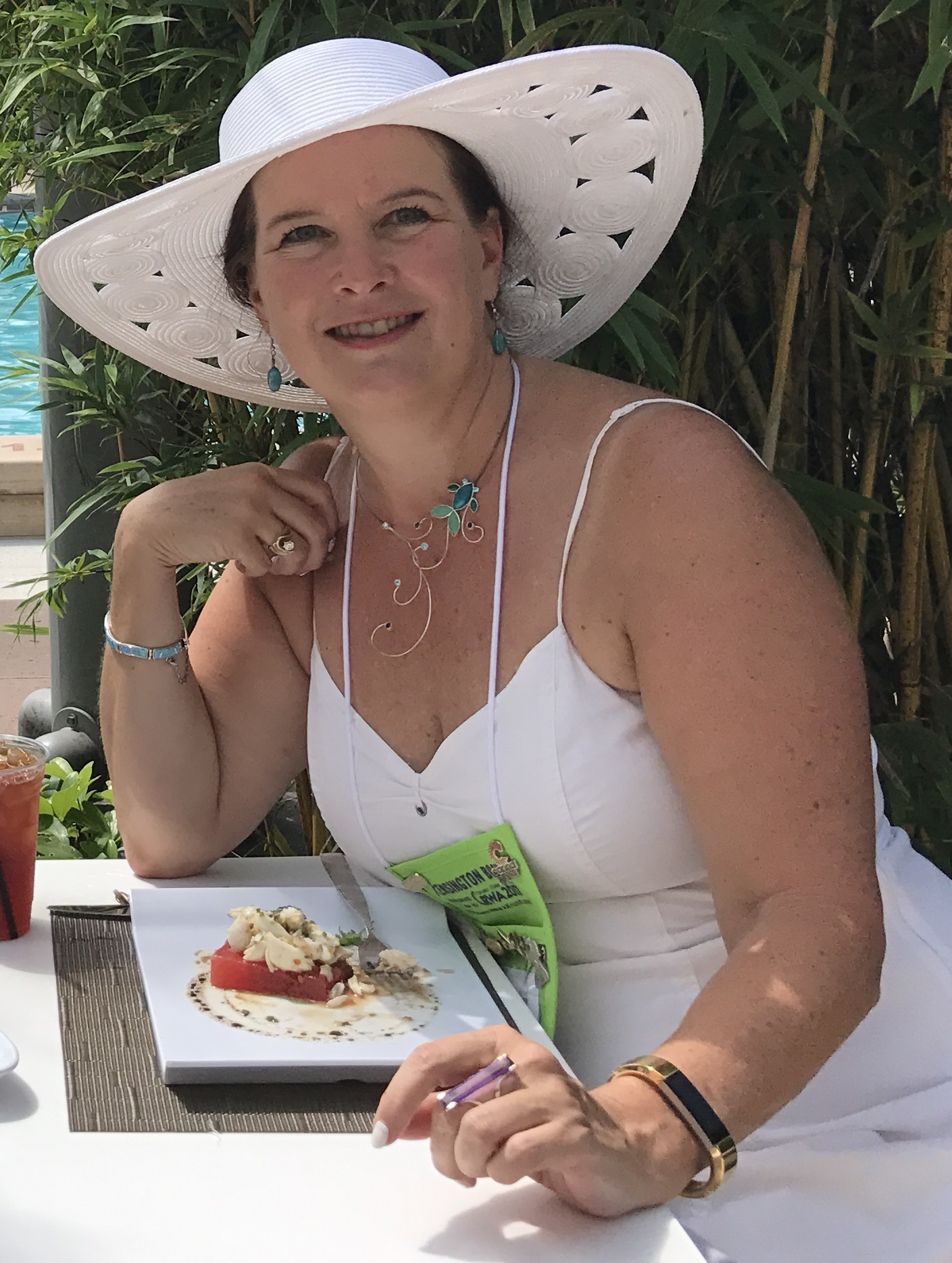
- Occupation: Writer
- Writing career
- Language: English
- Years active: 2008–present
- Genres: fantasy, erotic romance
- Notable work: The Twelve Kingdoms series
- Notable awards: RITA award – Paranormal Romance; 2017 The Pages of the Mind
- Website: www.jeffekennedy.com

Jeffe Kennedy is a fantasy and erotic romance author who has published dozens of novels, including the fantasy romance series The Twelve Kingdoms, The Uncharted Realms, and The Chronicles of Dasnaria from Kensington Books. Her novel The Pages of the Mind won the 2017 RITA Award for Best Paranormal Romance. In 2019, St. Martin's Press released The Orchid Throne, her first book in a new romantic fantasy series titled The Forgotten Empires.

== Life ==
Jeffe Kennedy grew up in Aurora, Colorado, where she graduated from Overland High School. Her father was a U.S. Air Force pilot who died in the crash of an F-4 fighter plane in 1969.

Kennedy received her undergraduate degree in biology and religious studies from Washington University in St. Louis. She received a master's degree in neurophysiology from the University of Wyoming, Laramie, where she did her graduate work studying the brains of bats.

Kennedy currently lives in Santa Fe, New Mexico.

== Writing ==
Kennedy has published 16 novels, many of which are erotic romances or epic romantic fantasies. She has also published essays, short stories, and poetry in a number of publications, including Redbook, The SFWA Bulletin, and Romantic Times, among others.

Kennedy says that "Fantasy romance hits my sweet spot. The fantasy aspect lets me create worlds, set up the social mores for maximum thrill, and have heroines who are larger than life. The romance gives me room to have the heroines find themselves through sexual exploration and the love of someone who appreciates them as no one else does. Both allow for the heights of emotion that lead to personal transformation, which I love."

Kennedy's stories have been praised for being "well-written and swooningly romantic", containing relationships that are "gripping and realistic." Her stories have also been praised for their "depth of worldbuilding."

She previously wrote the blog Contemporary Romance Cafe.

== Awards and honors ==
Kennedy has received a fellowship from the Ucross Foundation, a Wyoming Arts Council Fellowship for Poetry, and a Frank Nelson Doubleday Memorial Award.

The Mark of the Tala, the first book in the Twelve Kingdoms series, was the winner of a 2014 Seal of Excellence award from Romantic Times and a finalist for the 2014 Romantic Times Book of the Year. The third book in the series, The Talon of the Hawk, won the 2015 Best Fantasy Romance Award from Romantic Times, while the series' second novel, The Tears of the Rose, was a finalist for the same award in 2014.

The Pages of the Mind, the first book in Kennedy's Uncharted Realms series, was a finalist for the 2016 Best Fantasy Romance Award from Romantic Times and won the 2017 RITA Award for Paranormal Romance from the Romance Writers of America.

The book For Crown and Kingdom: A Duo of Fantasy Romances, containing one novella by Grace Draven and one by Kennedy, was selected by Library Journal as one of the Best Books of 2016 in the category of e-originals genre fiction. Her novella "The Dragons of Summer," which first appeared in the anthology Seasons of Sorcery, was a finalist for a 2019 RITA Award.

== Selected bibliography ==
=== Novels ===
Facets of Passion series

- Sapphire (Harlequin imprint Carina Press, 2011)
- Platinum (Harlequin imprint Carina Press, 2013)
- Ruby (Harlequin imprint Carina Press, 2013)
- Five Golden Rings (Harlequin imprint Carina Press, 2013)

The Covenant of Thorns series

- Rogue's Pawn (Harlequin imprint Carina Press, 2012)
- Rogue's Possession (Harlequin imprint Carina Press, 2013)
- Rogue's Paradise (Harlequin imprint Carina Press, 2014)

Falling Under series

- Going Under (Harlequin imprint Carina Press, 2014)
- Under His Touch (Harlequin imprint Carina Press, 2015)
- Under Contract (Harlequin imprint Carina Press, 2015)

Master of the Opera (Kensington Books, serial novel, 2014)

Released serially as

- Master of the Opera Act 1: Passionate Overture
- Master of the Opera, Act 2: Ghost Aria
- Master of the Opera, Act 3: Phantom Serenade
- Master of the Opera, Act 4: Dark Interlude
- Master of the Opera Act 5: A Haunting Duet
- Master of the Opera, Act 6: Crescendo

Sorcerous Moons series

- Lonen's War (Brightlynx Publishing, 2016)
- Oria’s Gambit (Brightlynx Publishing, 2016)
- The Tides of Bára (Brightlynx Publishing, 2016)
- The Forests Of Dru (Brightlynx Publishing, 2017)
- Lonen's Reign (Brightlynx Publishing, 2017)
- Oria's Enchantment (Brightlynx Publishing, 2019)

Forgotten Empires

- The Orchid Throne (St. Martin's Press, 2019)
- The Fiery Crown (St. Martin's Press, 2020)
- The Promised Queen (St. Martin's Press, 2021)

=== The Twelve Kingdoms universe ===
Novels in The Twelve Kingdoms series

- The Mark of the Tala (Kensington Books, 2014)
- The Tears of the Rose (Kensington Books, 2014)
- The Talon of the Hawk (Kensington Books, 2015)

Novels in the Uncharted Realms series

- The Pages of the Mind (Kensington Books, 2016)
- The Edge of the Blade (Kensington Books, 2017)

Novellas in The Twelve Kingdoms universe

- Heart's Blood (2015)
- "The Crown of the Queen" (published in For Crown and Kingdom: A Duo of Fantasy Romances by Grace Draven and Jeffe Kennedy, 2017)
