= Amy Richter =

Episcopal priest

The Rev. Dr. Amy E. Richter
- Former Rector of St. Anne's Church, Annapolis
- Church: St. Anne's Church, Annapolis
- Province: Episcopal Church in the United States
- Diocese: Maryland
- In office: 2009-2018
- Predecessor: The Rev. John Price
- Other post: Rector of the St. Paul's Episcopal Church, Milwaukee Associate Rector of St. Chrysostom's Episcopal Church in Chicago

Orders
- Ordination: 1994

Personal details
- Born: Amy Elizabeth Richter
- Denomination: Episcopalian
- Spouse: Joseph Pagano
- Occupation: Episcopal priest
- Education: Valparaiso University, Harvard Divinity School, Princeton Theological Seminary, Marquette University

Amy Elizabeth Richter is an Episcopal priest. She served as rector of St. Anne's Church in Annapolis, Maryland from 2009 until 2018.

Richter received a Ph.D. in New Testament Theology from Marquette University. She holds an M.Div. from Princeton Theological Seminary, an M.T.S. from Harvard Divinity School, a B.A. from Valparaiso University, and a Diploma in Anglican Studies from the General Theological Seminary of the Episcopal Church.

Richter is the author of one book and co-author of two.

Richter was featured in a New York Times article about competing in a bodybuilding competition.
