= O. Carter Snead =

American law professor

O. Carter Snead is an American legal scholar and bioethicist.

Snead obtained a Bachelor of Arts at St. John's College in Maryland and completed his legal education at the Georgetown University Law Center. He is the Charles E. Rice Professor of Law at Notre Dame Law School with a joint appointment in the College of Arts and Letters in the department of political science. From 2012 to 2024, he was director of the de Nicola Center for Ethics and Culture at the University of Notre Dame.

== Selected publications ==
- Snead, O. Carter (2020). What It Means to Be Human: The Case for the Body in Public Bioethics. Harvard University Press. ISBN 9780674987722. JSTOR j.ctv15tt7h9.
