= Tony Lagouranis =

US Army soldier

Specialist Tony Lagouranis (born c. 1969) is a former United States Army soldier, best known for having participated in torture as an interrogator during the occupation of Iraq. He was featured in the 2008 Academy Award-winning documentary Taxi to the Dark Side.

Lagouranis was born in Chicago, Illinois, United States, and graduated from high school in 1987 in New York City, going on to study Ancient Greek as part of his degree program at St. John's College in Santa Fe, New Mexico, and Arabic at the Defense Language Institute in Monterey, California.

For roughly 10 months in 2004, Lagouranis was stationed in Abu Ghraib prison (Lagouranis was only at Abu Ghraib for a month and a half) near Baghdad and for a short time in the Iraqi city of Mosul, where he claims to have observed and took part in a number of interrogation techniques including diet-alteration, the use of military dogs to induce terror, inducing hypothermia (with associated involuntary rectal thermometer readings), sleep deprivation, and the presence of ghost detainees.

Lagouranis is one of a handful of Iraq War veterans who provided first hand accounts of the torture and abuse of Iraqi prisoners by members of the US military. (Others have given similar accounts while shielding their identities.) In his op-ed for the New York Times, titled "Tortured Logic", he argues that senior officers and politicians are successfully evading the responsibility they should bear for the abuse of prisoners in Iraq and elsewhere. His book, Fear Up Harsh: An Army Interrogator's Dark Journey through Iraq (co-authored with Allen Mikaelian), was published June 5, 2007.

He is grandson of the prominent Greek lawyer, Lieutenant Colonel of the Army, General Staff Officer during WW2 and subsequently member of the Resistance, Constantine Lagouranis (1898-1953).

== Filmography ==
- 2006 - Iraq for Sale: The War Profiteers
- 2007 - Ghosts of Abu Ghraib
- 2007 - Taxi to the Dark Side
