= Eva Brann =

American academic (1929–2024)

Eva T. H. Brann (January 1, 1929 – October 28, 2024) was an American academician, dean and the longest-serving tutor at St. John's College, Annapolis. She was a 2005 recipient of the National Humanities Medal.

== Life and career ==
Brann was born to a Jewish family in Berlin. She emigrated in 1941 to the United States and received her B.A. from Brooklyn College in 1950, her M.A. in classics from Yale University in 1951, and her Ph.D. in archaeology from Yale in 1956. She also held an Honorary Doctorate from Middlebury College.

In her early years at St. John's, she was very close to Jacob Klein. After Klein died, Brann increasingly assumed his role as the defining figure of St. John's, the St. John's program, and the continuing dialogue with the Great Books represented by the program.

Brann died on October 28, 2024, at the age of 95.

== Bibliography ==
=== Selected published works ===
- Late Geometric and Protoattic Pottery, Mid 8th to Late 7th Century B.C.: Results of excavations conducted by the American school of classical studies at Athens (1962)
- Abraham Lincoln, The Gettysburg Address, and American Constitutionalism by Leo Paul S. de Alvarez, ed. (Berns, Laurence; Thurow, Glen E.; Brann, Eva; Anastaplo, George; contributors) (1976)
- Paradoxes of Education in a Republic (1979)
- The World of the Imagination (1992)
- Philosophical Imagination and Cultural Memory: Appropriating Historical Traditions by Patricia Cook (Editor), George Allan (Contributor), Donald PhillipVerene (Contributor), Alasdair MacIntyre (Contributor), J. B.Schneewind (Contributor), Lynn S.Joy (Contributor), Robert CummingsNeville (Contributor), Eva T. H.Brann (Contributor), George Kline (Contributor), John S.Rickard (Contributor), Stanley Rosen (Contributor)
- The Past-Present: Selected Writings of Eva Brann (1997)
- The Study of Time: Philosophical Truth and Human Consequences (Kritikos Professorship in the Humanities, 1999.)
- What, Then, Is Time? (1999)
- Introduction to His Monkey Wife or Married to a Chimp by John Collier (2000)
- The Ways of Naysaying: No, Not, Nothing, and Nonbeing (2001)
- Homeric Moments: Clues to Delight in Reading the Odyssey and the Iliad (2002)
- The Music of the Republic: Essays on Socrates' Conversations and Plato's Writings (2004)
- Open Secrets/Inward Prospects: Reflections on Word and Soul (2004)
- Feeling Our Feelings: What Philosophers Think and People Know (2008)
- Homage to Americans: Mile-High Meditations, Close Readings, and Time-Spanning Speculations (2010)
- The Logos of Heraclitus (2011)
- Un-Willing: An Inquiry into the Rise of Will's Power and an Attempt to Undo It (2014)
- Then & Now: The World's Center and the Soul's Demesne (2015)

=== Translations ===
- Klein, Jacob, Greek mathematical thought and the origin of algebra. [Die griechische Logistik und die Entstehung der Algebra], 1968
- Plato's Sophist or the Professor of Wisdom, 1996
- Plato's Phaedo: with Peter Kalkavage and Eric Salem, with translation, introduction and glossary, 1998
- Plato's Statesman: with Peter Kalkavage and Eric Salem, with translation, introduction and glossary, 2012
- Plato's Symposium or Drinking Party: with Peter Kalkavage and Eric Salem, with translation, introduction and glossary, 2017
