= James H. Frame =

James Hartwell Frame (1928 - 1997) was a computer pioneer who worked to standardize software development from the more idiosyncratic form of its unstructured early days into a predictable and manageable methodology. He spent the majority of his career with IBM, eventually being recruited by ITT Corporation. Later, he founded a consulting business, James Frame Enterprises.

== Early life ==
Frame was born in 1928 in Chicago, Illinois. In 1950, he graduated from St John's College in Annapolis, Maryland.

== Career ==
His career in software development management began with IBM in 1956. He worked during the early days of System 360 development. Later, he became the first director of the IBM Santa Teresa Laboratory in Silicon Valley. There, he was responsible for programming language development.

In 1962, journalist Chet Huntley interviewed Frame along with fellow IBM employees John Iverson, Bill Kelly, Tom McDonald and Warren Hume about the advent of IBM's computer solutions to the small business owner, the IBM 1440 data processing system. The interview features the San Jose facility that developed the 1440.

In 1978, ITT Corporation chairman Harold Geneen recruited Frame to work at ITT as vice-president heading the software division. Frame became one of the early champions of software quality metrics as a solution to the reliability problems plaguing the industry.

Following his corporate career he founded a successful consulting business, James Frame Enterprises (JFE), specializing in assessments and recommendations for improving software development methodologies for corporate clients in the telecom industry.

== Late career and death ==
In 1986, Frame was given the Award of Merit from the St. John's College Alumni Association.

Frame died in 1997 in East Meredith, New York.
