= Jean Baptiste LeLande =

Jean Baptiste LaLande was an American merchant. Born May 19, 1778, in Sainte Genevieve, Missouri, to Jean Baptiste LaLande Sr. and Marguerite Lefevre. In 1804 he left Kaskaskia, Illinois, with a small outfit of merchandise bound for Santa Fe, New Mexico. As a result, he is credited as being the first American to establish commercial contact with Santa Fe. At that time Santa Fe was Spanish territory and Spanish law prohibited foreigner trading. Upon arriving in New Mexico LaLande was arrested by Spanish authorities and the trade goods were confiscated. Spanish governor Alencaster released LaLande from prison in 1805 after LaLande agreed to accompany the Pedro Vial expedition in 1806. The expedition's purpose was to establish Pawnee allegiance to Spain.

After making New Mexico his home, Jean Baptiste Lalande married three times. On October 18, 1807, he married Maria Rita Abeyeta, and had 2 children. In 1811 he married Isabel Casados Cortez and had a daughter. On October 15, 1812, he married Maria Apolonia Lucero y Sandoval and had 6 children. Jean Baptiste LaLande died February 8, 1821, in Santa Fe, New Mexico.
