= Research ethics =

Ethical practice in scientific research

Research ethics is a discipline within the study of applied ethics. Its scope ranges from general scientific integrity and misconduct to the treatment of human and animal subjects. The social responsibilities of scientists and researchers are not traditionally included and are less well defined.

The discipline is most developed in medical research. Beyond the issues of falsification, fabrication, and plagiarism that arise in every scientific field, research design, human subject research, and animal testing are the areas that most often raise ethical questions.

The list of historic cases includes many large-scale violations and crimes against humanity such as Nazi human experimentation and the Tuskegee syphilis experiment which led to international codes of research ethics. No approach has been universally accepted, but typically cited codes are the 1947 Nuremberg Code, the 1964 Declaration of Helsinki, and the 1978 Belmont Report.

Today, research ethics committees, such as those of the US, UK, and EU, govern and oversee the responsible conduct of research. One major goal being to reduce questionable research practices.

Research in other fields such as social sciences, information technology, biotechnology, or engineering may generate ethical concerns.

== History ==
Early Human Experimentation and Ethical Concerns

During the late 1800s and early 1900s, the opening of new hospitals and scientific institutions created more opportunities for medical research and experimentation. However, this period also raised ethical concerns about human experimentation and animal testing. Some researchers tested drugs, surgical procedures, and the transmission of diseases without notifying or requesting consent from the human subjects. As more people became aware of these experiments, questions about whether these practices were ethical began to rise. During this period, the anti-vivisection movement also began to grow, and people who participated in this movement were against vivisection involving humans and animals, especially when these experiments caused harm or were done without patients' knowledge or consent. This movement helped raise more concerns and discussions about how humans and animals were being treated in scientific experiments.

Early Development of Ethical Guidelines

In 1900, antivivisectionists attempted to introduce a law that would regulate experiments involving humans; however, the American Medical Association opposed it, and the bill ended up not being passed. But even though passing the bill was unsuccessful, discussions about ethical treatment of research participants had already been taking place for many years. For example, Thomas Percival (1803), William Beaumont (1833), and Claude Bernard (1865) all had contributed different ideas about how humans should be treated during medical research. They discussed ethics about obtaining consent, allowing subjects to withdraw from experiments, and considering whether the research would benefit the people involved or not. Their ideas show that researchers had been considering ethical responsibilities long before modern research regulations were established.

The list of historic cases includes many large scale violations and crimes against humanity such as Nazi human experimentation and the Tuskegee syphilis experiment which led to international codes of research ethics. Medical ethics developed out of centuries of general malpractice and science motivated only by results. Medical ethics in turn led to today's more broad understanding in bioethics.

== Scientific conduct ==
=== Scientific integrity ===
Research integrity or scientific integrity is an aspect of research ethics that deals with best practice or rules of professional practice of scientists.

First introduced in the 19th century by Charles Babbage, the concept of research integrity came to the fore in the late 1970s. A series of publicized scandals in the United States led to heightened debate on the ethical norms of sciences and the limitations of the self-regulation processes implemented by scientific communities and institutions. Formalized definitions of scientific misconduct, and codes of conduct, became the main policy response after 1990. In the 21st century, codes of conduct or ethics codes for research integrity are widespread. Along with codes of conduct at institutional and national levels, major international texts include the European Charter for Researchers (2005), the Singapore Statement on Research Integrity (2010), the European Code of Conduct for Research Integrity (2011 & 2017), and the Hong Kong Principles for assessing researchers (2020).

Scientific literature on research integrity falls mostly into two categories: first, mapping of the definitions and categories, especially in regard to scientific misconduct, and second, empirical surveys of the attitudes and practices of scientists. Following the development of codes of conduct, taxonomies of non-ethical uses have been significantly expanded, beyond the long-established forms of scientific fraud (plagiarism, falsification and fabrication of results). Definitions of "questionable research practices" and the debate over reproducibility also target a grey area of dubious scientific results, which may not be the outcome of voluntary manipulations.

The concrete impact of codes of conduct and other measures put in place to ensure research integrity remain uncertain. Several case studies have highlighted that while the principles of typical codes of conduct adhere to common scientific ideals, they are seen as remote from actual work practices and their efficiency is criticized.

After 2010, debates on research integrity have been increasingly linked to open science. International codes of conduct and national legislation on research integrity have officially endorsed open sharing of scientific output (publications, data, and code used to perform statistical analyses on the data) as ways to limit questionable research practices and to enhance reproducibility. Having both the data and the actual code enables others to reproduce the results for themselves (or to uncover problems in the analyses when trying to do so). The European Code of Conduct for Research Integrity 2023 states, for example, the principles that, "Researchers, research institutions, and organisations ensure that access to data is as open as possible, as closed as necessary, and where appropriate in line with the FAIR Principles (Findable, Accessible, Interoperable and Reusable) for data management" and that "Researchers, research institutions, and organisations are transparent about how to access and gain permission to use data, metadata, protocols, code, software, and other research materials". References to open science have incidentally opened up the debate over scientific integrity beyond academic communities, as it increasingly concerns a wider audience of scientific readers.

=== Scientific misconduct ===
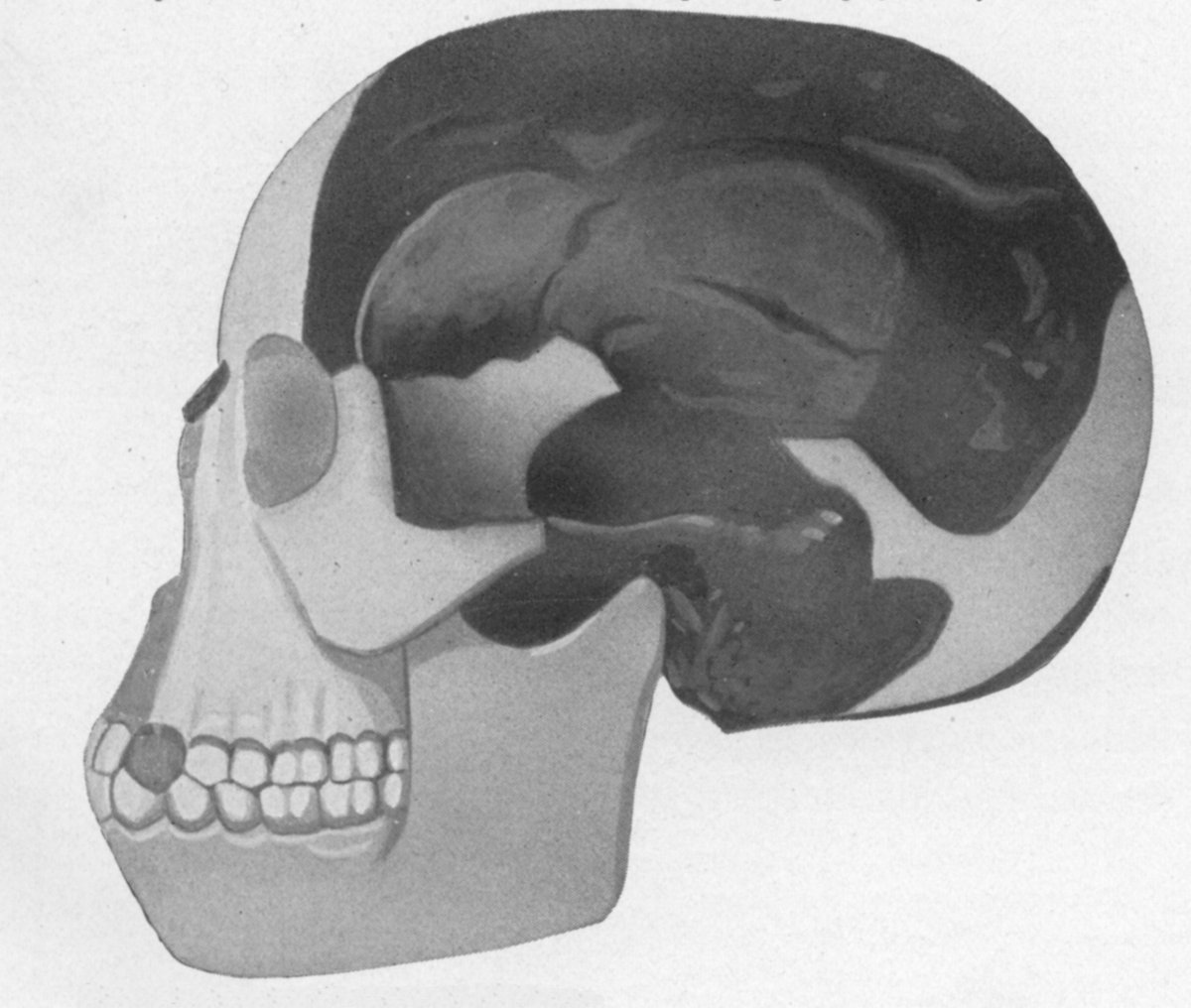
A reconstruction of the skull purportedly belonging to the Piltdown Man, a long-lasting case of scientific misconduct

Scientific misconduct is the violation of ethical and professional standards in research, including fabrication, falsification, plagiarism, and other practices that compromise the integrity of the design, conduct, analysis, reporting, or publication of scientific or research findings.

== Discipline specific ethics ==
Research ethics for Human subject research and Animal testing derives, historically, from Medical ethics and, in modern times, from the much more broad field of Bioethics.

=== Medical ethics ===
Medical ethics is an applied branch of ethics which analyzes the practice of clinical medicine and related scientific research. Medical ethics is based on a set of values that professionals can refer to in the case of any confusion or conflict. These values include the respect for autonomy, non-maleficence, beneficence, and justice. Such tenets may allow doctors, care providers, and families to create a treatment plan and work towards the same common goal. These four values are not ranked in order of importance or relevance and they all encompass values pertaining to medical ethics. However, a conflict may arise leading to the need for hierarchy in an ethical system, such that some moral elements overrule others with the purpose of applying the best moral judgement to a difficult medical situation. Medical ethics is particularly relevant in decisions regarding involuntary treatment and involuntary commitment.

There are several codes of conduct. The Hippocratic Oath discusses basic principles for medical professionals. This document dates back to the fifth century BCE. Both the Declaration of Helsinki (1964) and the Nuremberg Code (1947) are two well-known and well respected documents contributing to medical ethics. Beyond these milestones, both the development of hemodialysis in the 1960's and the overturning of Roe v. Wade by the Supreme Court in 2022 made an impact on the history of medical ethics. In 1973, Roe v. Wade was passed and became legal under the Constitution of the United States. However, now the States hold the power to impose their own laws on access to abortion services. This reversal causes a conflict with moral judgment if a doctor should be legally punished for providing an abortion to save a patient's life. In the beginning stages of hemodialysis, initial concerns arose about the ethical reasoning behind choosing which patients were a priority in using hemodialysis due to the scarcity of equipment. These concerns evolved from scarcity to the dilemma of the contentious practice with patients who lack the decision-making mentality. Whether doctors should abandon treatment because of their behavioral issues, disregarding their life-or-death situations.

As this field continues to develop and change throughout history, the focus remains on fair, balanced, and moral thinking across all cultural and religious backgrounds around the world. The field of medical ethics encompasses both practical application in clinical settings and scholarly work in philosophy, history, and sociology.

Medical ethics encompasses beneficence, autonomy, and justice as they relate to conflicts such as euthanasia, patient confidentiality, informed consent, and conflicts of interest in healthcare. In addition, medical ethics and culture are interconnected as different cultures implement ethical values differently, sometimes placing more emphasis on family values and downplaying the importance of autonomy. This leads to an increasing need for culturally sensitive physicians and ethical committees in hospitals and other healthcare settings.

=== Bioethics ===
Bioethics is both a field of study and professional practice, interested in ethical issues related to health (primarily focused on the human, but also increasingly includes animal ethics), including those emerging from advances in biology, medicine, and technologies. It proposes the discussion about moral discernment in society (what decisions are "good" or "bad" and why) and it is often related to medical policy and practice, but also to broader questions as environment, well-being and public health. Bioethics is concerned with the ethical questions that arise in the relationships among life sciences, biotechnology, medicine, politics, law, theology and philosophy. It includes the study of values relating to primary care, other branches of medicine ("the ethics of the ordinary"), ethical education in science, animal, and environmental ethics, and public health.

=== Clinical research ethics ===
==== Study participant rights ====
Participants in a clinical trial in clinical research have rights which they expect to be honored, including:

- informed consent
- shared decision-making
- privacy for research participants
- return of results
- to withdraw

==== Vulnerable populations ====
Study participants are entitled to some degree of autonomy in deciding their participation. One measure for safeguarding this right is the use of informed consent for clinical research. Researchers refer to populations with limited autonomy as "vulnerable populations"; these are subjects who may not be able to fairly decide for themselves whether to participate. Examples of vulnerable populations include incarcerated persons, children, prisoners, soldiers, people under detention, migrants, persons exhibiting insanity or any other condition that precludes their autonomy, and to a lesser extent, any population for which there is reason to believe that the research study could seem particularly or unfairly persuasive or misleading. Ethical problems particularly encumber using children in clinical trials.

== Society ==
The consequences for the environment, society, and future generations must be considered.

== Governance ==
An ethics committee is a body responsible for ensuring that medical experimentation and human subject research are carried out in an ethical manner in accordance with national and international law.

- In the United Kingdom, the National Research Ethics Service is the responsible quango that forms Research Ethic Committees.
- In the United States, the Institutional review board is the relevant ethics committee.
- In Canada, there are different committees for different agencies. The committees are the Research Ethics Board (REB) as well as two others that split their committee duties between conduct (PRCR) and ethics committee (PRE).
- The European Union only sets the guidelines for its member's ethics committees.
- Large international organizations like the WHO have their own ethics committees.

In Canada, mandatory research ethics training is required for students, professors and others who work in research. The US first legislated institutional review boards procedures in the 1974 National Research Act.

== Criticism ==
Published in Social Sciences & Medicine (2009) several authors suggested that research ethics in a medical context is dominated by principlism.

== See also ==
- List of medical ethics cases
- Children in clinical research
- Unethical human experimentation
- Self-experimentation in medicine
- Clinical trial
- Academic freedom
- Scientific literature § Ethics
- Psychology § Ethics
- Information ethics
- Regulation of genetic engineering
- Engineering ethics
- Ethics of technology
- Research Integrity Risk Index
- Philosophy of engineering
- Philosophy of science

== Sources ==
- Laine, Heidi (31 December 2018). "Open science and codes of conduct on research integrity". Informaatiotutkimus. 37 (4). doi:10.23978/inf.77414. hdl:10138/293054. ISSN 1797-9129.
