= Research =

Systematic study undertaken to increase knowledge

Research is creative and systematic work undertaken to increase the stock of knowledge. It involves the collection, organization, and analysis of evidence to increase understanding of a topic, characterized by a particular attentiveness to controlling sources of bias and error. These activities are characterized by accounting and controlling for biases. A research project may be an expansion of past work in the field. To test the validity of instruments, procedures, or experiments, research may replicate elements of prior projects or the project as a whole.

The primary purposes of basic research (as opposed to applied research) are documentation, discovery, interpretation, and the research and development (R&D) of methods and systems for the advancement of human knowledge. Approaches to research depend on epistemologies, which vary considerably both within and between humanities and sciences. There are several forms of research: scientific, humanities, artistic, economic, social, business, marketing, practitioner research, life, technological, etc. The scientific study of research practices is known as meta-research.

A researcher is a person who conducts research.

== Etymology ==
Aristotle, (384–322 BC), an Ancient Greek philosopher and pioneer in developing the scientific method

The word research is derived from the Middle French "recherche", which means "to go about seeking", the term itself being derived from the Old French term "recerchier", a compound word from "re-" + "cerchier", or "sercher", meaning 'search'. The earliest recorded use of the term was in 1577.

== Definitions ==
Research, in its simplest terms, is an intentional search for knowledge.

John W. Creswell states that "research is a process of steps used to collect and analyze information to increase our understanding of a topic or issue".

The Merriam-Webster Online Dictionary defines research to also include studying already existing knowledge: "studious inquiry or examination; especially: investigation or experimentation aimed at the discovery and interpretation of facts, revision of accepted theories or laws in the light of new facts, or practical application of such new or revised theories or laws".

== Forms of research ==
=== Original research ===
Original research, also called primary research, is research that is not exclusively based on a summary, review, or synthesis of earlier publications on the subject of research. This material is of a primary-source character. The purpose of the original research is to produce new knowledge rather than present the existing knowledge in a new form (e.g., summarized or classified). Original research can take various forms, depending on the discipline it pertains to. In experimental work, it typically involves direct or indirect observation of the researched subject(s), e.g., in the laboratory or in the field, documents the methodology, results, and conclusions of an experiment or set of experiments, or offers a novel interpretation of previous results. In analytical work, there are typically some new (for example) mathematical results produced or a new way of approaching an existing problem. In some subjects which do not typically carry out experimentation or analysis of this kind, the originality is in the particular way existing understanding is changed or re-interpreted based on the outcome of the work of the researcher.

The degree of originality of the research is among the major criteria for articles to be published in academic journals and usually established by means of peer review. Graduate students are commonly required to perform original research as part of a dissertation.

=== Scientific research ===
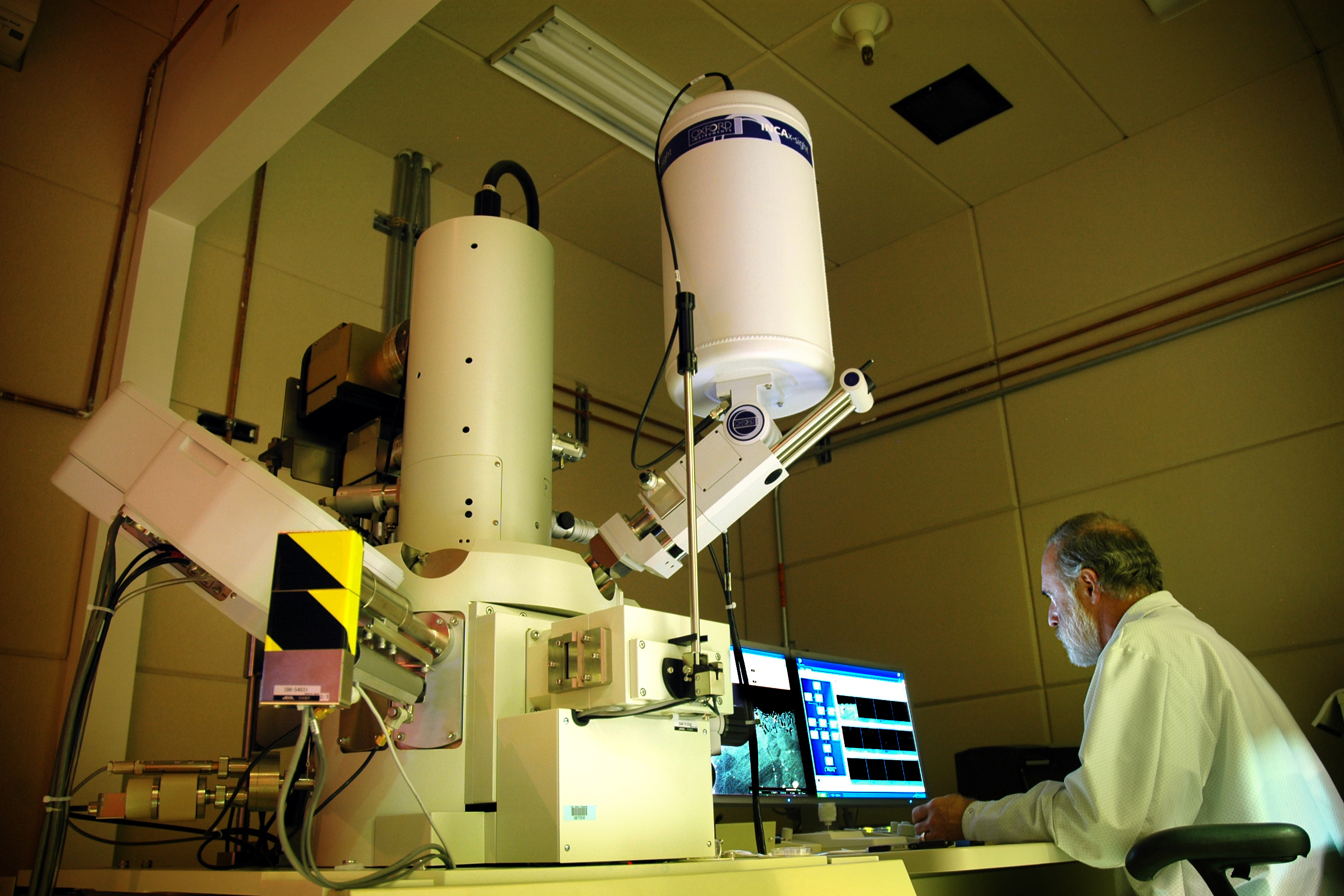
Primary scientific research being carried out at the Microscopy Laboratory at the Idaho National Laboratory

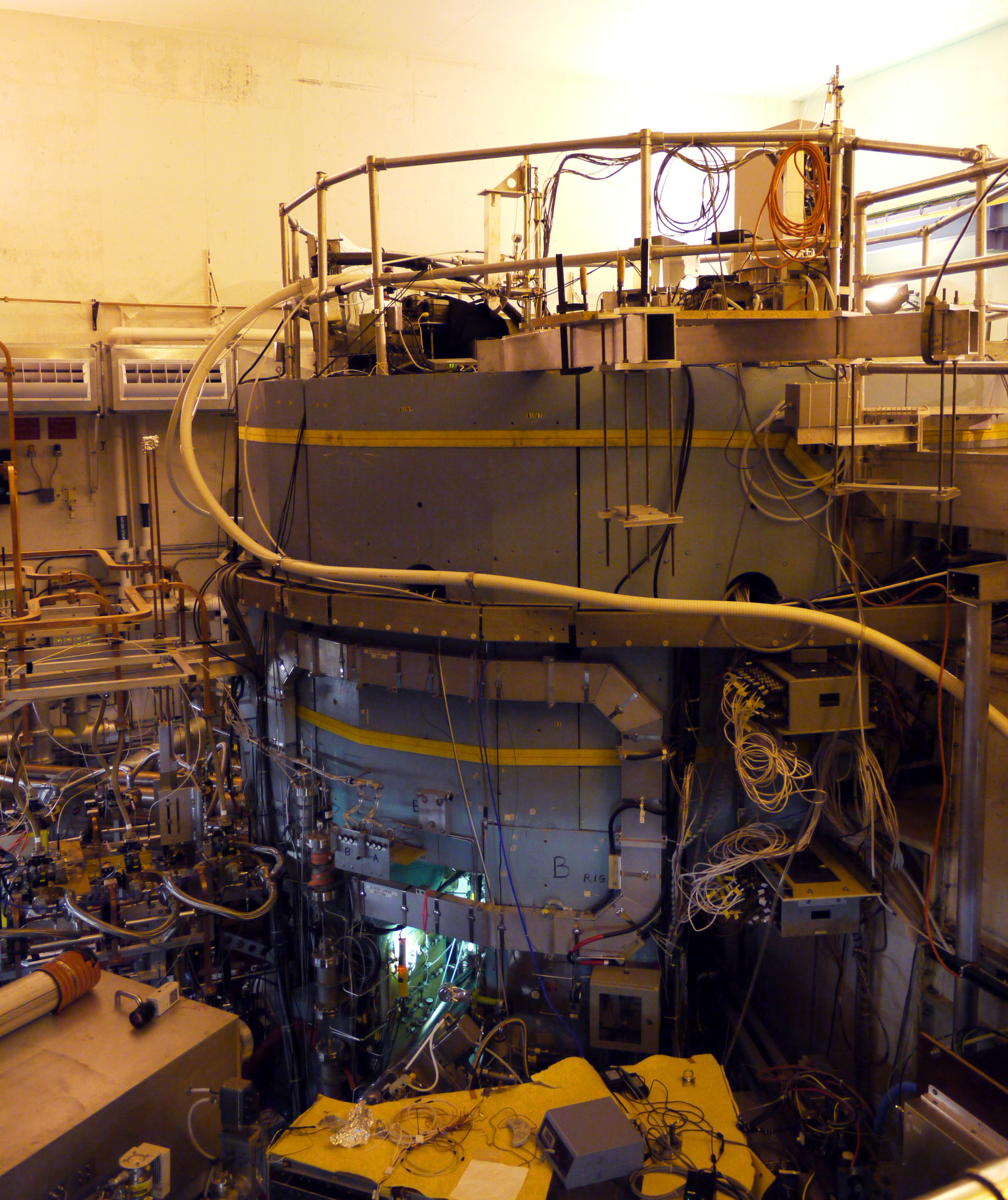
Scientific research equipment at MIT

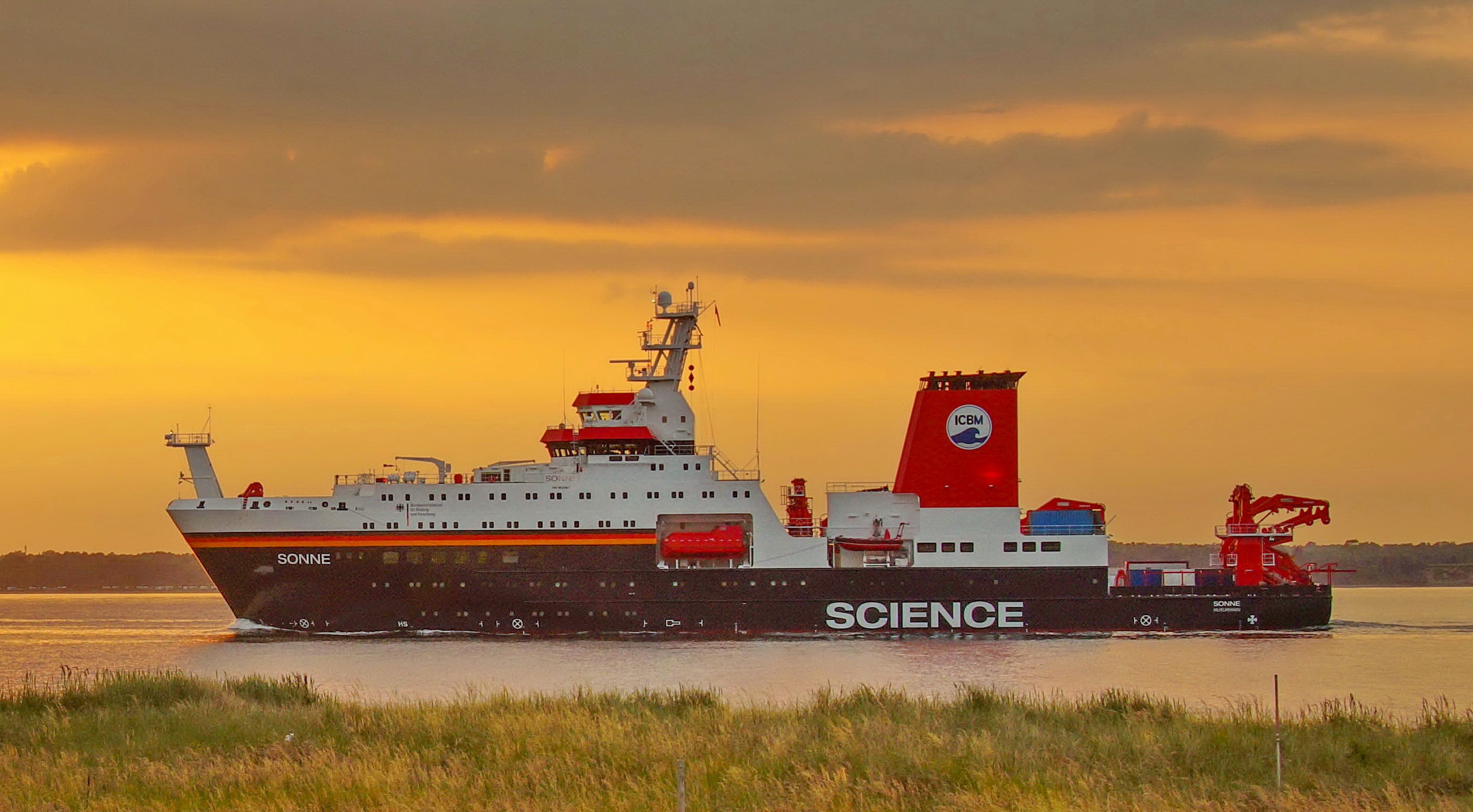
The German maritime research vessel Sonne

Scientific research is a systematic way of gathering data and harnessing curiosity. This research provides scientific information and theories for the explanation of the nature and the properties of the world. It makes practical applications possible. Scientific research may be funded by public authorities, charitable organizations, and private organizations. Scientific research can be subdivided by discipline.

Generally, research is understood to follow a certain structural process. Though the order may vary depending on the subject matter and researcher, the following steps are usually part of most formal research, both basic and applied:

1. Observations and formation of the topic: Consists of the subject area of one's interest and following that subject area to conduct subject-related research. The subject area should not be randomly chosen since it requires reading a vast amount of literature on the topic to determine the gap in the literature the researcher intends to narrow. A keen interest in the chosen subject area is advisable. The research will have to be justified by linking its importance to already existing knowledge about the topic.
2. Hypothesis: A testable prediction which designates the relationship between two or more variables.
3. Conceptual definition: Description of a concept by relating it to other concepts.
4. Operational definition: Details in regards to defining the variables and how they will be measured/assessed in the study.
5. Gathering of data: Consists of identifying a population and selecting samples, gathering information from or about these samples by using specific research instruments. The instruments used for data collection must be valid and reliable.
6. Analysis of data: Involves breaking down the individual pieces of data to draw conclusions about it.
7. Data Interpretation: This can be represented through tables, figures, and pictures, and then described in words.
8. Test, revising of hypothesis
9. Conclusion, reiteration if necessary

=== Research in the humanities ===
Research in the humanities involves different methods such as for example hermeneutics and semiotics. Humanities scholars usually do not search for the ultimate correct answer to a question, but instead, explore the issues and details that surround it. Context is always important, and context can be social, historical, political, cultural, or ethnic. An example of research in the humanities is historical research, which is embodied in historical method. Historians use primary sources and other evidence to systematically investigate a topic, and then to write histories in the form of accounts of the past. Other studies aim to merely examine the occurrence of behaviours in societies and communities, without particularly looking for reasons or motivations to explain these. These studies may be qualitative or quantitative, and can use a variety of approaches, such as queer theory or feminist theory.

=== Artistic research ===
Artistic research, also seen as 'practice-based research', can take form when creative works are considered both the research and the object of research itself. It is the debatable body of thought which offers an alternative to purely scientific methods in research in its search for knowledge and truth.

The controversial trend of artistic teaching becoming more academics-oriented is leading to artistic research being accepted as the primary mode of enquiry in art as in the case of other disciplines. One of the characteristics of artistic research is that it must accept subjectivity as opposed to the classical scientific methods. As such, it is similar to the social sciences in using qualitative research and intersubjectivity as tools to apply measurement and critical analysis.

Artistic research has been defined by the School of Dance and Circus (Dans och Cirkushögskolan, DOCH), Stockholm in the following manner – "Artistic research is to investigate and test with the purpose of gaining knowledge within and for our artistic disciplines. It is based on artistic practices, methods, and criticality. Through presented documentation, the insights gained shall be placed in a context." Artistic research aims to enhance knowledge and understanding with presentation of the arts. A simpler understanding by Julian Klein defines artistic research as any kind of research employing the artistic mode of perception. For a survey of the central problematics of today's artistic research, see Giaco Schiesser.

According to artist Hakan Topal, in artistic research, "perhaps more so than other disciplines, intuition is utilized as a method to identify a wide range of new and unexpected productive modalities". Most writers, whether of fiction or non-fiction books, also have to do research to support their creative work. This may be factual, historical, or background research. Background research could include, for example, geographical or procedural research.

The Society for Artistic Research (SAR) publishes the triannual Journal for Artistic Research (JAR), an international, online, open access, and peer-reviewed journal for the identification, publication, and dissemination of artistic research and its methodologies, from all arts disciplines and it runs the Research Catalogue (RC), a searchable, documentary database of artistic research, to which anyone can contribute.

Patricia Leavy addresses eight arts-based research (ABR) genres: narrative inquiry, fiction-based research, poetry, music, dance, theatre, film, and visual art.

In 2016, the European League of Institutes of the Arts launched The Florence Principles' on the Doctorate in the Arts. The Florence Principles relating to the Salzburg Principles and the Salzburg Recommendations of the European University Association name seven points of attention to specify the Doctorate / PhD in the Arts compared to a scientific doctorate / PhD. The Florence Principles have been endorsed and are supported also by AEC, CILECT, CUMULUS and SAR.

=== Historical research ===
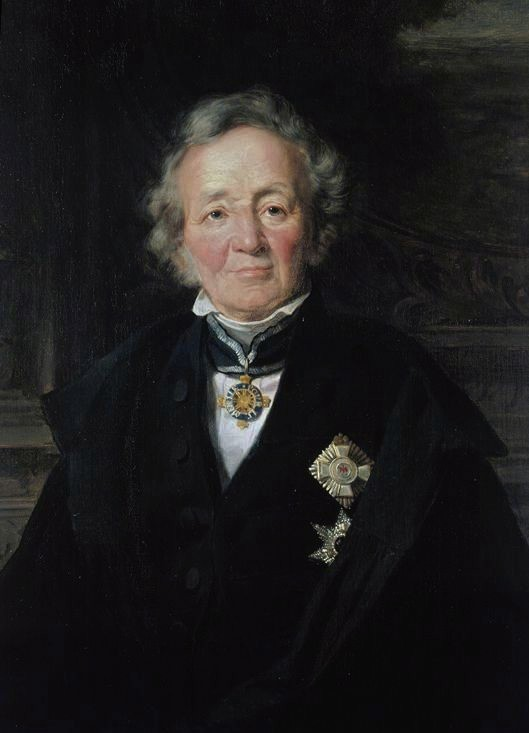
Leopold von Ranke (1795–1886), a German historian and a founder of modern source-based history

The historical method comprises the techniques and guidelines by which historians use historical sources and other evidence to research and then to write history. There are various history guidelines that are commonly used by historians in their work, under the headings of external criticism, internal criticism, and synthesis. This includes lower criticism and sensual criticism. Though items may vary depending on the subject matter and researcher, the following concepts are part of most formal historical research:

- Identification of origin date
- Evidence of localization
- Recognition of authorship
- Analysis of data
- Identification of integrity
- Attribution of credibility

== Steps in conducting research ==
Research design and evidence

Research cycle

Research is often conducted using the hourglass model structure of research. The hourglass model starts with a broad spectrum for research, focusing in on the required information through the method of the project (like the neck of the hourglass), then expands the research in the form of discussion and results. The major steps in conducting research are:

- Identification of research problem
- Literature review
- Specifying the purpose of research
- Determining specific research questions
- Specification of a conceptual framework, sometimes including a set of hypotheses
- Choice of a methodology (for data collection)
- Data collection
- Verifying data
- Analyzing and interpreting the data
- Reporting and evaluating research
- Communicating the research findings and, possibly, recommendations

The steps generally represent the overall process; however, they should be viewed as an ever-changing iterative process rather than a fixed set of steps. Most research begins with a general statement of the problem, or rather, the purpose for engaging in the study. The literature review identifies flaws or holes in previous research which provides justification for the study. Often, a literature review is conducted in a given subject area before a research question is identified. A gap in the current literature, as identified by a researcher, then engenders a research question. The research question may be parallel to the hypothesis. The hypothesis is the supposition to be tested. The researcher(s) collects data to test the hypothesis. The researcher(s) then analyzes and interprets the data via a variety of statistical methods, engaging in what is known as empirical research. The results of the data analysis in rejecting or failing to reject the null hypothesis are then reported and evaluated. At the end, the researcher may discuss avenues for further research. However, some researchers advocate for the reverse approach: starting with articulating findings and discussion of them, moving "up" to identification of a research problem that emerges in the findings and literature review. The reverse approach is justified by the transactional nature of the research endeavor where research inquiry, research questions, research method, relevant research literature, and so on are not fully known until the findings have fully emerged and been interpreted.

Rudolph Rummel says, "... no researcher should accept any one or two tests as definitive. It is only when a range of tests are consistent over many kinds of data, researchers, and methods can one have confidence in the results."

Plato in Meno talks about an inherent difficulty, if not a paradox, of doing research that can be paraphrased in the following way, "If you know what you're searching for, why do you search for it?! [i.e., you have already found it] If you don't know what you're searching for, what are you searching for?!"

== Research methods ==
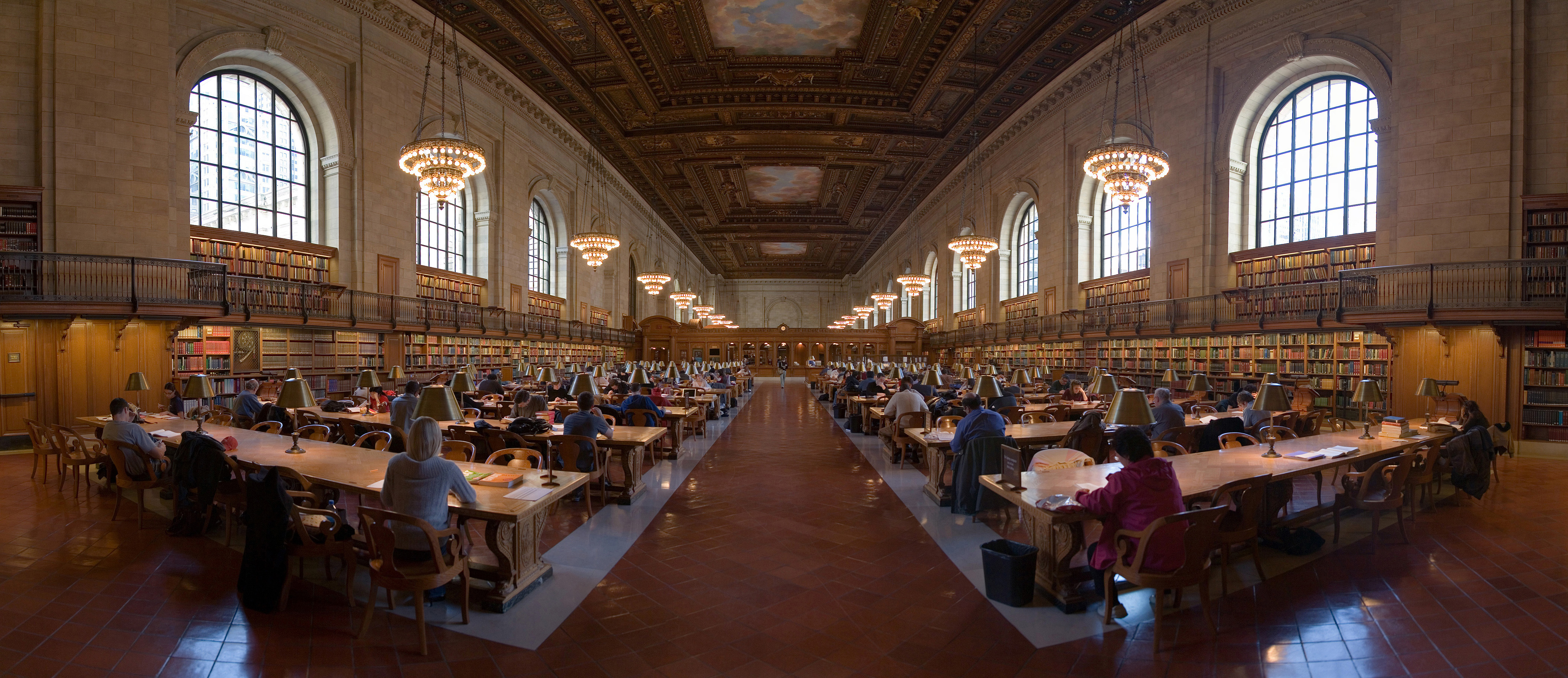
The research room at the New York Public Library, an example of secondary research in progress

The goal of the research process is to produce new knowledge or deepen understanding of a topic or issue. This process takes three main forms (although, as previously discussed, the boundaries between them may be obscure):

- Exploratory research, which helps to identify and define a problem or question.
- Constructive research, which tests theories and proposes solutions to a problem or question.
- Empirical research, which tests the feasibility of a solution using empirical evidence.

There are two major types of empirical research design: qualitative research and quantitative research. Researchers choose qualitative or quantitative methods according to the nature of the research topic they want to investigate and the research questions they aim to answer:

Qualitative research Qualitative research refers to much more subjective non-quantitative, use different methods of collecting data, analyzing data, interpreting data for meanings, definitions, characteristics, symbols metaphors of things. Qualitative research further classified into the following types: Ethnography: This research mainly focus on culture of group of people which includes share attributes, language, practices, structure, value, norms and material things, evaluate human lifestyle. Ethno: people, Grapho: to write, this disciple may include ethnic groups, ethno genesis, composition, resettlement and social welfare characteristics. Phenomenology: It is very powerful strategy for demonstrating methodology to health professions education as well as best suited for exploring challenging problems in health professions educations. In addition, PMP researcher Mandy Sha argued that a project management approach is necessary to control the scope, schedule, and cost related to qualitative research design, participant recruitment, data collection, reporting, as well as stakeholder engagement.

Quantitative research Quantitative research involves systematic empirical investigation of quantitative properties and phenomena and their relationships, by asking a narrow question and collecting numerical data to analyze it utilizing statistical methods. The quantitative research designs are experimental, correlational, and survey (or descriptive). Statistics derived from quantitative research can be used to establish the existence of associative or causal relationships between variables. Quantitative research is linked with the philosophical and theoretical stance of positivism.

The quantitative data collection methods rely on random sampling and structured data collection instruments that fit diverse experiences into predetermined response categories. These methods produce results that can be summarized, compared, and generalized to larger populations if the data are collected using proper sampling and data collection strategies. Quantitative research is concerned with testing hypotheses derived from theory or being able to estimate the size of a phenomenon of interest.

If the research question is about people, participants may be randomly assigned to different treatments (this is the only way that a quantitative study can be considered a true experiment). If this is not feasible, the researcher may collect data on participant and situational characteristics to statistically control for their influence on the dependent, or outcome, variable. If the intent is to generalize from the research participants to a larger population, the researcher will employ probability sampling to select participants.

In either qualitative or quantitative research, the researcher(s) may collect primary or secondary data. Primary data is data collected specifically for the research, such as through interviews or questionnaires. Secondary data is data that already exists, such as census data, which can be re-used for the research. It is good ethical research practice to use secondary data wherever possible.

Mixed-method research, i.e. research that includes qualitative and quantitative elements, using both primary and secondary data, is becoming more common. This method has benefits that using one method alone cannot offer. For example, a researcher may choose to conduct a qualitative study and follow it up with a quantitative study to gain additional insights.

Big data has brought big impacts on research methods so that now many researchers do not put much effort into data collection; furthermore, methods to analyze easily available huge amounts of data have also been developed.

Non-empirical research Non-empirical (theoretical) research is an approach that involves the development of theory as opposed to using observation and experimentation. As such, non-empirical research seeks solutions to problems using existing knowledge as its source. This, however, does not mean that new ideas and innovations cannot be found within the pool of existing and established knowledge. Non-empirical research is not an absolute alternative to empirical research because they may be used together to strengthen a research approach. Neither one is less effective than the other since they have their particular purpose in science. Typically empirical research produces observations that need to be explained; then theoretical research tries to explain them, and in so doing generates empirically testable hypotheses; these hypotheses are then tested empirically, giving more observations that may need further explanation; and so on. See Scientific method.

A simple example of a non-empirical task is the prototyping of a new drug using a differentiated application of existing knowledge; another is the development of a business process in the form of a flow chart and texts where all the ingredients are from established knowledge. Much of cosmological research is theoretical in nature. Mathematics research does not rely on externally available data; rather, it seeks to prove theorems about mathematical objects.

== Research ethics ==
Research ethics is a discipline within the study of applied ethics. Its scope ranges from general scientific integrity and misconduct to the treatment of human and animal subjects. The social responsibilities of scientists and researchers are not traditionally included and are less well defined.

The discipline is most developed in medical research. Beyond the issues of falsification, fabrication, and plagiarism that arise in every scientific field, research design, human subject research, and animal testing are the areas that most often raise ethical questions.

The list of historic cases includes many large-scale violations and crimes against humanity such as Nazi human experimentation and the Tuskegee syphilis experiment which led to international codes of research ethics. No approach has been universally accepted, but typically cited codes are the 1947 Nuremberg Code, the 1964 Declaration of Helsinki, and the 1978 Belmont Report.

Today, research ethics committees, such as those of the US, UK, and EU, govern and oversee the responsible conduct of research. One major goal being to reduce questionable research practices.

Research in other fields such as social sciences, information technology, biotechnology, or engineering may generate ethical concerns.

== Problems in research ==
=== Metascience ===
Metascience is the study of research through the use of research methods. Also known as "research on research", it aims to reduce waste and increase the quality of research in all fields. Meta-research concerns itself with the detection of bias, methodological flaws, and other errors and inefficiencies. Among the finding of meta-research is a low rates of reproducibility across a large number of fields.

=== Replication crisis ===
The replication crisis, also known as the reproducibility crisis or replicability crisis, is a widespread phenomenon in which published scientific results cannot be reproduced. Because the reproducibility of empirical results is the cornerstone of the scientific method, such failures undermine the credibility of theories and challenge substantial parts of scientific knowledge.

=== Academic bias ===
Academic bias is the bias or perceived bias in academia shaping research and the scientific community. Academic bias can involve discrimination based on race, sex, religion, ideology or protected group. One study sent a questionnaire to students and staff in a range of American universities. 44% of undergraduates and 27% of professors claimed that they had witnessed overt biases within the classroom. Respondents claimed that bias was directed at individuals because of their sexual orientation, ethnicity, race, sex, religion and class. The types of bias witnessed involved stereotyping, offensive humour, social isolation, slurs and insults. Academic bias can result in a citation bias, suppress scientific dissent and prevent the discovery of scientific truth.

=== Funding bias ===
Funding bias, also known as sponsorship bias, funding outcome bias, funding publication bias, and funding effect, is a tendency of a scientific study to support the interests of the study's financial sponsor. This phenomenon is recognized sufficiently that researchers undertake studies to examine bias in past published studies. Funding bias has been associated, in particular, with research into chemical toxicity, tobacco, and pharmaceutical drugs. It is an instance of experimenter's bias.

=== Publication bias ===
In published academic research, publication bias occurs when the outcome of an experiment or research study biases the decision to publish or otherwise distribute it. Publishing only results that show a significant finding disturbs the balance of findings in favor of positive results. The study of publication bias is an important topic in metascience.

=== Non-western methods ===
In many disciplines, Western methods of conducting research are predominant. Researchers are overwhelmingly taught Western methods of data collection and study. The increasing participation of indigenous peoples as researchers has brought increased attention to the scientific lacuna in culturally sensitive methods of data collection. Western methods of data collection may not be the most accurate or relevant for research on non-Western societies. For example, "Hua Oranga" was created as a criterion for psychological evaluation in Māori populations, and is based on dimensions of mental health important to the Māori people – "taha wairua (the spiritual dimension), taha hinengaro (the mental dimension), taha tinana (the physical dimension), and taha whanau (the family dimension)".

Even though Western dominance seems to be prominent in research, some scholars, such as Simon Marginson, argue for "the need [for] a plural university world". Marginson argues that the East Asian Confucian model could take over the Western model.

This could be due to changes in funding for research both in the East and the West. Focused on emphasizing educational achievement, East Asian cultures, mainly in China and South Korea, have encouraged the increase of funding for research expansion. In contrast, in the Western academic world, notably in the United Kingdom as well as in some state governments in the United States, funding cuts for university research have occurred, which some say may lead to the future decline of Western dominance in research.

=== Language ===
Research is often biased in the languages that are preferred (linguicism) and the geographic locations where research occurs. Periphery scholars face the challenges of exclusion and linguicism in research and academic publication. As the great majority of mainstream academic journals are written in English, multilingual periphery scholars often must translate their work to be accepted to elite Western-dominated journals. Multilingual scholars' influences from their native communicative styles can be assumed to be incompetence instead of difference. Patterns of geographic bias also show a relationship with linguicism: countries whose official languages are French or Arabic are far less likely to be the focus of single-country studies than countries with different official languages. Within Africa, English-speaking countries are more represented than other countries.

=== Generalizability ===
Generalization is the process of more broadly applying the valid results of one study. Studies with a narrow scope can result in a lack of generalizability, meaning that the results may not be applicable to other populations or regions. In comparative politics, this can result from using a single-country study, rather than a study design that uses data from multiple countries. Despite the issue of generalizability, single-country studies have risen in prevalence since the late 2000s.

For comparative politics, Western countries are over-represented in single-country studies, with heavy emphasis on Western Europe, Canada, Australia, and New Zealand. Since 2000, Latin American countries have become more popular in single-country studies. In contrast, countries in Oceania and the Caribbean are the focus of very few studies.

=== Publication peer review ===
Peer review is a form of self-regulation by qualified members of a profession within the relevant field. Peer review methods are employed to maintain standards of quality, improve performance, and provide credibility. In academia, scholarly peer review is often used to determine an academic paper's suitability for publication. Usually, the peer review process involves experts in the same field who are consulted by editors to give a review of the scholarly works produced by a colleague of theirs from an unbiased and impartial point of view, and this is usually done free of charge. The tradition of peer reviews being done for free has however brought many pitfalls which are also indicative of why most peer reviewers decline many invitations to review. It was observed that publications from periphery countries rarely rise to the same elite status as those of North America and Europe.

=== Open research ===
The open research, open science and open access movements assume that all information generally deemed useful should be free and belongs to a "public domain", that of "humanity". This idea gained prevalence as a result of Western colonial history and ignores alternative conceptions of knowledge circulation. For instance, most indigenous communities consider that access to certain information proper to the group should be determined by relationships. There is alleged to be a double standard in the Western knowledge system. On the one hand, "digital right management" used to restrict access to personal information on social networking platforms is celebrated as a protection of privacy, while simultaneously when similar functions are used by cultural groups (i.e. indigenous communities) this is denounced as "access control" and reprehended as censorship.

== Professionalisation ==
In several national and private academic systems, the professionalisation of research has resulted in formal job titles.

=== In Russia ===
In present-day Russia, and some other countries of the former Soviet Union, the term researcher (Russian: Научный сотрудник, nauchny sotrudnik) has been used both as a generic term for a person who has been carrying out scientific research, and as a job position within the frameworks of the Academy of Sciences, universities, and in other research-oriented establishments.

The following ranks are known:

- Junior Researcher (Junior Research Associate)
- Researcher (Research Associate)
- Senior Researcher (Senior Research Associate)
- Leading Researcher (Leading Research Associate)
- Chief Researcher (Chief Research Associate)

== Publishing ==
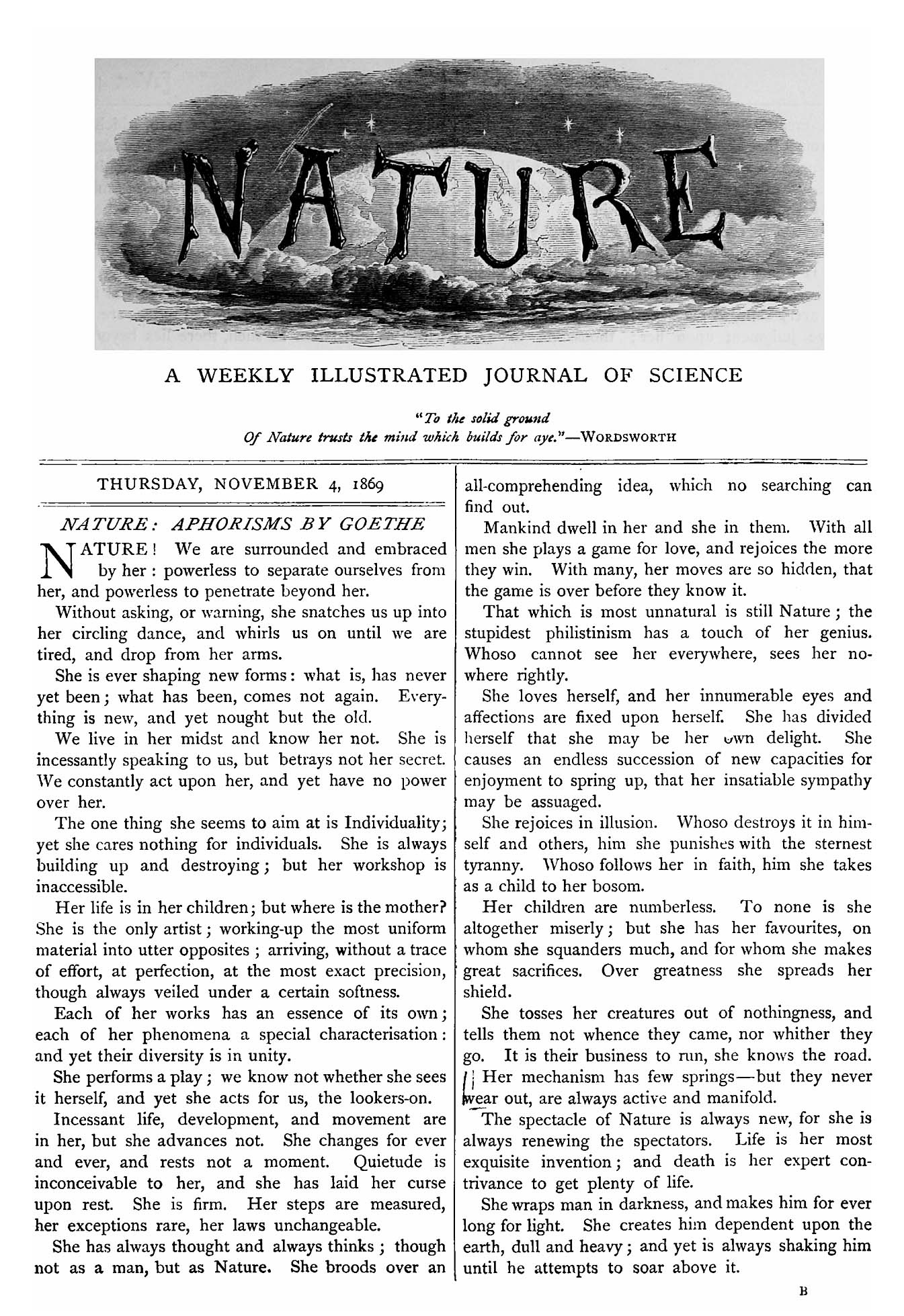
The cover of the first issue of Nature, 4 November 1869

Academic publishing is a system that is necessary for academic scholars to peer review the work and make it available for a wider audience. The system varies widely by field and is also always changing, if often slowly. Most academic work is published in journal article or book form. There is also a large body of research that exists in either a thesis or dissertation form. These forms of research can be found in databases explicitly for theses and dissertations. In publishing, STM publishing is an abbreviation for academic publications in science, technology, and medicine. Most established academic fields have their own scientific journals and other outlets for publication, though many academic journals are somewhat interdisciplinary, and publish work from several distinct fields or subfields. The kinds of publications that are accepted as contributions of knowledge or research vary greatly between fields, from the print to the electronic format. A study suggests that researchers should not give great consideration to findings that are not replicated frequently. It has also been suggested that all published studies should be subjected to some measure for assessing the validity or reliability of its procedures to prevent the publication of unproven findings. Business models are different in the electronic environment. Since about the early 1990s, licensing of electronic resources, particularly journals, has been very common. Presently, a major trend, particularly with respect to scholarly journals, is open access. There are two main forms of open access: open access publishing, in which the articles or the whole journal is freely available from the time of publication, and self-archiving, where the author makes a copy of their own work freely available on the web.

== Research statistics and funding ==
Most funding for scientific research comes from three major sources: corporate research and development departments; private foundations; and government research councils such as the National Institutes of Health in the US and the Medical Research Council in the UK. These are managed primarily through universities and in some cases through military contractors. Many senior researchers (such as group leaders) spend a significant amount of their time applying for grants for research funds. These grants are necessary not only for researchers to carry out their research but also as a source of merit. The Social Psychology Network provides a comprehensive list of U.S. Government and private foundation funding sources.

The total number of researchers (full-time equivalents) per million inhabitants for individual countries is shown in the following table.

Country	researchers (full-time equivalents) per million inhabitants 2018
Algeria	819
Argentina	1192
Austria	5733
Belgium	5023
Bulgaria	2343
Canada	4326
Chile	493
China	1307
Costa Rica	380
Croatia	1921
Cyprus	1256
Czechia	3863
Denmark	8066
Egypt	687
Estonia	3755
Finland	6861
France	4715
Georgia	1464
Germany	5212
Greece	3483
Hungary	3238
Iceland	6131
India	253
Indonesia	216
Iran	1475
Ireland	5243
Israel	2307
Italy	2307
Japan	5331
Jordan	596
Kazakhstan	667
Kuwait	514
Latvia	1792
Lithuania	3191
Luxembourg	4942
Malaysia	2397
Malta	1947
Mauritius	474
Mexico	315
Moldova	696
Montenegro	734
Morocco	1074
Netherlands	5605
New Zealand	5530
North Macedonia	799
Norway	6467
Pakistan	336
Poland	3106
Portugal	4538
Romania	882
Russia	2784
Serbia	2087
Singapore	6803
Slovakia	2996
Slovenia	4855
South Africa	518
South Korea	7980
Spain	3001
Sweden	7536
Switzerland	5450
Thailand	1350
Tunisia	1772
Turkey	1379
Ukraine	988
United Arab Emirates	2379
United Kingdom	4603
United States of America	4412
Uruguay	696
Vietnam	708

Research expenditure by type of research as a share of GDP for individual countries is shown in the following table.

Country	Research expenditure as a share of GDP by type of research (%), 2018		
Country	Basic	Applied	Development
Algeria	0.01	0.27	0.02
Argentina	0.14	0.27	0.12
Austria	0.54	1.00	1.46
Belgium	0.30	1.24	1.16
Bulgaria	0.08	0.47	0.20
Chile	0.10	0.14	0.08
China	0.12	0.24	1.82
Costa Rica	0.10	0.07	0.02
Croatia	0.33	0.28	0.25
Cyprus	0.08	0.30	0.18
Czechia	0.50	0.77	0.66
Denmark	0.56	0.95	1.54
Estonia	0.35	0.28	0.66
France	0.50	0.92	0.78
Greece	0.35	0.37	0.41
Hungary	0.26	0.30	0.78
Iceland	0.43	0.95	0.66
India	0.10	0.15	0.13
Ireland	0.22	0.42	0.55
Italy	0.31	0.58	0.49
Israel	0.52	0.51	3.93
Japan	0.41	0.62	2.10
Kazakhstan	0.02	0.07	0.03
Kuwait	0.00	0.06	0.00
Latvia	0.16	0.22	0.13
Lithuania	0.24	0.38	0.28
Luxembourg	0.48	0.49	0.33
Malaysia	0.42	0.81	0.21
Malta	0.30	0.19	0.09
Mauritius	0.03	0.12	0.02
Mexico	0.10	0.09	0.12
Montenegro	0.10	0.21	0.04
Netherlands	0.52	0.87	0.60
New Zealand	0.34	0.55	0.48
North Macedonia	0.09	0.23	0.05
Norway	0.38	0.79	0.93
Poland	0.30	0.18	0.55
Portugal	0.29	0.51	0.53
Romania	0.10	0.31	0.09
Russia	0.15	0.21	0.65
Serbia	0.29	0.34	0.29
Singapore	0.46	0.61	0.87
Slovakia	0.33	0.20	0.30
Slovenia	0.33	0.82	0.71
South Africa	0.22	0.44	0.17
South Korea	0.68	1.06	3.07
Spain	0.26	0.50	0.45
Switzerland	1.41	1.09	0.88
Thailand	0.10	0.27	0.64
Ukraine	0.11	0.10	0.27
United Kingdom	0.30	0.74	0.64
United States of America	0.47	0.56	1.80
Vietnam	0.07	0.30	0.04

== See also ==
- Advertising research
- European Charter for Researchers
- Internet research
- Laboratory
- List of words ending in ology
- Market research
- Marketing research
- Operations research
- Participatory action research
- Psychological research methods
- Research integrity
- Research-intensive cluster
- Research organization
- Research proposal
- Research university
- Scholarly research
- Secondary research
- Social research
- Society for Artistic Research
- Timeline of the history of the scientific method
- Undergraduate research

== Sources ==
- Creswell, John W. (2008). Educational Research: Planning, conducting, and evaluating quantitative and qualitative research (3rd ed.). Upper Saddle River, NJ: Pearson. ISBN 978-0-13-613550-0.
- Kara, Helen (2012). Research and Evaluation for Busy Practitioners: A Time-Saving Guide. Bristol: The Policy Press. ISBN 978-1-44730-115-8.
