= Pracademic =

Someone who is both an academic and a practitioner

A pracademic (or practitioner-academic or academic-practitioner) is someone who is both an academic and an active practitioner in their subject area.

== History ==
The term's first coining is unclear. The earliest reference may have been identified by a subscriber to Worldwide Words as being 1973. Jon Van Til, one of the pioneers in nonprofit organization research and education, reports hearing this word first spoken by Hank Rubin, then director of Public Administration at Roosevelt University, in 1989: In "an auditorium filled with academics and nonproifit practitioners ... (w)e were listening to a session being conducted by the Independent Sector organization. Hank ... rose to make a brief statement during which he observed that many of us in the hall were both academics and practitioners. We were, therefore, he announced, 'pracademics'!"

In his 2001 article "The Life and Times of Pracademics", Paul L Posner discusses the term pracademic. Since Posner's article many academics have used the term in journals and elsewhere. In their 2001 paper in Negotiation Journal, Maria R Volpe and David Chandler describe the bridging role as that of the "pracademic". Again in 2001, Willard T. Price uses the term in the same context of academic and practicing professional in Public Works. George L Hanbury builds on the term in his 2004 paper on the ethics of honor by describing himself as a pracademic and observing his subject from this standpoint.

Although the core bridging concept appears to be the main theme, several other usages have emerged. The idea of the pracademic as a teaching style for entrepreneurs has appeared in several places. A pracademic degree, for instance, describes the case of a new degree in the UK that is taught by practitioners to students who want to be entrepreneurs. However, this use of the term remains close to the main definition of bridging the academic and practical professional world. Additionally, many academics now describe themselves as pracademics on their websites, and this use of the term aligns well with definition as commonly used.

There may be other uses of the term. For example, in 2000, the term was used to describe Ross James, who conceptualised the Transitional Learning Model following extensive research for his doctoral dissertation. The model integrated learning and cross-cultural theories into a practical model to help workplace trainers design and deliver training. The model has been applied in a wide range of workplace settings. Health Communication Resources has used the model in its extensive international delivery of resources for training learner-centred trainers in international radio broadcast networks.

The term was first used in relation to the UK resilience community at the inaugural conference of the Institute of Civil Protection and Emergency Management (April 2009). Peter Simpson from the London Fire Brigade, who undertook a Master’s programme at Leicester University as a mature student, described people like himself and others in the resilience community as ‘pracademics’ and showed delegates the ‘Pracademic Curve’, which clearly illustrated the inter-relationship between the practitioner and academic communities, particularly as it affects those who go into academia having already embarked on a career as a practitioner.

In 2008, the term was introduced in the Criminal Justice education arena, with a paper and presentation entitled The Pracademic and Academic in Criminal Justice Education (Morreale and McCabe, 2012) at the Academy of Criminal Justice Sciences by Stephen A. Morreale of Worcester State University and James E. McCabe of Sacred Heart University, now at St. John's University. The paper focuses on the benefit of blending faculty that represent both the academic and pracademic perspectives, for the benefit of both the academic department and Criminal Justice students.

Many designers also have started taking interest in this term lately in their theories, research as well as practice. In 2008, Ahmedabad based architectural firm has named their office as studio prAcademics. Studio is led by Tejas Kathiriya providing architecture, interior design and urban design services. They are involved in merging the design theories with professional practice and vice versa.

In 2013, the term was introduced to the field of language teaching and teacher education as well. Writing about teacher education practices in general, and teacher education in the Teaching of English to Speakers of Other Languages (TESOL) in particular, Jain theorized about the relevance of the term to the lives of those who work on the intersections of practice and research. Jain has since been using the term "pracademic" individually and collaboratively to (re)imagine her own and her colleagues' professional identities in language teaching and teacher education as that comprising coherent, albeit hybridized, unities -— that of a practitioners as well as an academics.

== See also ==
- Practitioner research
