= Philosophy of engineering =

Discipline

The philosophy of engineering is an emerging discipline that considers what engineering is, what engineers do, and how their work affects society, and thus includes aspects of ethics and aesthetics, as well as the ontology, epistemology, etc. that might be studied in, for example, the philosophy of science or the philosophy of technology.

== History ==
Engineering is the profession aimed at modifying the natural environment, through the design, manufacture and maintenance of artifacts and technological systems. It might then be contrasted with science, the aim of which is to understand nature. Engineering at its core is about causing change, and therefore management of change is central to engineering practice. The philosophy of engineering is then the consideration of philosophical issues as they apply to engineering. Such issues might include the objectivity of experiments, the ethics of engineering activity in the workplace and in society, the aesthetics of engineered artifacts, etc.

While engineering seems historically to have meant devising, the distinction between art, craft and technology isn't clearcut. The Latin root ars, the Germanic root kraft and the Greek root techne all originally meant the skill or ability to produce something, as opposed to, say, athletic ability. The something might be tangible, like a sculpture or a building, or less tangible, like a work of literature. Nowadays, art is commonly applied to the visual, performing or literary fields, especially the so-called fine arts ('the art of writing'), craft usually applies to the manual skill involved in the manufacture of an object, whether embroidery or aircraft ('the craft of typesetting') and technology tends to mean the products and processes currently used in an industry ('the technology of printing'). In contrast, engineering is the activity of effecting change through the design and manufacture of artifacts ('the engineering of print technology').

== Ethics ==
What distinguishes engineering design from artistic design is the requirement for the engineer to make quantitative predictions of the behavior and effect of the artifact prior to its manufacture. Such predictions may be more or less accurate but usually includes the effects on individuals and/or society. In this sense, engineering can be considered a social as well a technological discipline and judged not just by whether its artifacts work, in a narrow sense, but also by how they influence and serve social values. What engineers do is subject to moral evaluation.

=== Modeling ===
Socio-technical systems, such as transport, utilities and their related infrastructures comprise human elements as well as artifacts. Traditional mathematical and physical modeling techniques may not take adequate account of the effects of engineering on people, and culture. The Civil Engineering discipline makes elaborate attempts to ensure that a structure meets its specifications and other requirements prior to its actual construction. The methods employed are well known as Analysis and Design. Systems Modelling and Description makes an effort to extract the generic unstated principles behind the engineering approach.

=== Product life cycle ===
The traditional engineering disciplines seem discrete but the engineering of artifacts has implications that extend beyond such disciplines into areas that might include psychology, finance and sociology. The design of any artifact will then take account of the conditions under which it will be manufactured, the conditions under which it will be used, and the conditions under which it will be disposed. Engineers can consider such "life cycle" issues without losing the precision and rigor necessary to design functional systems.

== See also ==
- Carl Mitcham
- Henry Petroski
- Philosophy of technology
- Philosophy of science
- Ethics
- Science and Engineering Ethics

== Publications ==
=== Books ===
- P. & Gunn A.S. (1998), Engineering, Ethics, and the Environment, Cambridge University Press, New York
- Addis W (1990) Structural Engineering: The Nature of Theory and Design, Ellis Horwood, Chichester, UK
- Addis W (1986) Theory and Design in Civil and Structural Engineering: A Study in the History and Philosophy of Engineering, PhD Thesis, University of Reading
- Bucciarelli L.L. (2003) Engineering Philosophy, Delft University Press, Delft
- Bush V. (1980) Science, The Endless Frontier, National Science Foundation Press, Washington DC
- Beale N., Peyton-Jones S.L. et al. (1999) Cybernauts Awake Ethical and Spiritual Implications of Computers, Information Technology and the Internet Church House Publishing ISBN
- Cutcliffe S.H. (2000) Ideas, Machines and Values: An introduction to Science, Technology and Social Studies, Rowman and Littlefield, Lanham, MD
- Davis, M. (1998) Thinking like an Engineer: Studies in the Ethics of a Profession, Oxford University Press, New York.
- Florman, Samuel C. (1981) Blaming Technology: The Irrational Search for Scapegoats, St Martin's Press, New York
- Florman, Samuel C. (1987) The Civilized Engineer, St Martin's Press, New York
- Florman, Samuel C. (1968) Engineering and the Liberal Arts : A Technologist's Guide to History, Literature
- Florman, Samuel C. (1994) The Existential Pleasures of Engineering, 2nd ed, St Martin's Press, New York
- Florman, Samuel C. (1996) The Introspective Engineer, St Martin's Press, New York
- Goldman S.L. (1991) "The social captivity of Engineering", Critical Perspectives on non academic Science and Engineering, (ed Durbin P.T.), Lehigh University Press, Bethlehem, PA
- Goldman S.L. (1990) "Philosophy, Engineering and Western Culture", in Broad and Narrow interpretations of Philosophy of Technology, (ed Durbin P.T.), Kluwer, Amsterdam
- Harris E.C, Pritchard M.S. & Rabins M.J. (1995), Engineering Ethics: Concepts and Cases, Wadsworth, Belmont, CA
- Johnston, S., Gostelow, P., Jones, E. (1999), Engineering and Society: An Australian perspective, 2nd Ed. Longman,
- Lewis, Arthur O. Jr. ed. (1963), Of Men and Machines, E.P. Dutton
- Martin M.W. & Schinzinger R (1996), Ethics in Engineering, 3rd ed. McGraw-Hill, New York
- Mitcham C. (1999), Thinking through Technology: The Path between Engineering and Philosophy, University of Chicago Press, Chicago, pp. 19–38.
- Mumford L. (1970) The Myth of the Machine, Harcourt Brace Javonovich, New York
- Blockley, David (1980) The Nature of Structural Design and Safety, Ellis Howood, Chichester, UK. ISBN 0-85312-179-6 (Free download)
- Blockley, David (Editor) (1992) Engineering Safety, McGraw Hill, ISBN 0-07-707593-5 (Free download)
- Blockley, David (2010) A Very Short Introduction to Engineering Oxford University Press, ISBN 9780199578696
- Petroski, Henry (1992) To Engineer Is Human: The Role of Failure in Successful Design
- Petroski, Henry (2010) The Essential Engineer: Why Science Alone Will Not Solve Our Global Problems
- Simon H. (1996), The Sciences of the Artificial, 3rd ed. MIT Press, Cambridge, MA
- Unger S.H. (1994), Controlling Technology: Ethics and the Responsible Engineer, 2nd ed., John Wiley, New York
- Vincenti W.G. (1990) What Engineers Know and How They Know It: Analytical Studies from Aeronautical History, The Johns Hopkins University Press, Baltimore, Md.
- Anthonie Meijers, ed. (2009). Philosophy of technology and engineering sciences. Handbook of the Philosophy of Science. Vol. 9. Elsevier. ISBN 978-0-444-51667-1.
- Jeroen van den Hoven, Seumas Miller & Thomas Pogge (2017). Designing in Ethics. Cambridge University Press, Cambridge. ISBN 978-051-18-4431-7
- Priyan Dias (2019). Philosophy for Engineering: Practice, Context, Ethics, Models, Failure. Springer Singapore. ISBN 978-981-15-1270-4
- Carl Mitcham (2019). Steps toward a Philosophy of Engineering: Historico-Philosophical and Critical Essays. ISBN 978-1-78661-126-0

=== Articles ===
- Philosophy in the Making by Natasha McCarthy Ingenia March 26, 2006
- Creed M.J. (1993) "Introducing Structures in a Modern Curriculum", Proceedings of the Conference, Innovation and Change in Civil Engineering Education, The Queen's University of Belfast
- Davis, M. (2001) The Professional Approach to Engineering Ethics: Five Research Questions, Science and Engineering Ethics 7 (July 2001): 379-390.
- Lewin D (1981) Engineering Philosophy - The Third Culture, Paper to the Royal Society, UK
- Mitcham C. (1994), "Engineering Design Research and Social Responsibility", Ethics of Scientific Research, pp. 153–196 and 221-223
- Hess, J.L. and Fore, G., (2018). "A systematic literature review of US engineering ethics interventions", Science and Engineering Ethics, 24(2), pp. 551–583.
- Mitcham, C. and Englehardt, E.E., 2019. "Ethics across the curriculum: Prospects for broader (and deeper) teaching and learning in research and engineering ethics", Science and Engineering Ethics, 25(6), pp. 1735–1762.
