= Sytse Strijbos =

Dutch academic (born 1944)

Sytse Strijbos (born 1944) is a Dutch academic, former lecturer of Philosophy of technology at the Vrije Universiteit in Amsterdam and at Potchefstroom University in South Africa, and chairman of the International Institute for Development and Ethics IIDE, known for his work on systems science.

== Biography ==
Born in Rotterdam, Strijbos graduated in Chemical Engineering at the Delft University of Technology late 1960s. Later in his career he received his PhD in 1988 at the Vrije Universiteit in Amsterdam with a thesis entitled "Het technische wereldbeeld : een wijsgerig onderzoek van het systeemdenken" (The technological world-view: a philosophical study of systems thinking) under supervision of Sander Griffioen and Egbert Schuurman.

After his graduation in Delft, Strijbos worked as researcher at the Philips Natuurkundig Laboratorium for ten years. On invitation of Hendrik van Riessen, his former Professor in Delft who had moved to Amsterdam, he then joined the Faculty of Philosophy of the Vrije Universiteit in the Department of Systematic Philosophy and Philosophy of Culture. In 1979 he edited the proceedings of the Congress on Systems thinking and social problems held at the Vrije Universiteit. In the 1980s he moved to the Department of Socio-cultural Philosophy and Philosophy of History, where he worked on medical ethics In the 1990s he also lectured at the Academic Centre for Dentistry Amsterdam (ACTA)

In the new millennium he lectured philosophy in the Christian studies of Science and Society program. He was also Professor at the Philosophy Department of North-West University, Potchefstroom Campus, South Africa. In 2003 he founded and became the first director of the International Institute for Development and Ethics IIDE.

== Selected publications ==
Books:

- Strijbos, Sytse. Het technische wereldbeeld : een wijsgerig onderzoek van het systeemdenken Doctorate thesis Vrije Universiteit, Amsterdam 1988.
- Strijbos, Sytse, and Andrew Basden. In Search of an Integrative Vision for Technology: Interdisciplinary Studies in Information Systems (Contemporary Systems Thinking). Springer-Verlag New York, Inc., 2006.
- From our side : emerging perspectives on development and ethics

Articles, a selection:

- Strijbos, S. "How can systems thinking help us in bridging the gap between science and wisdom?." Systems Practice 8.4 (1995): 361-376.
- Polder, J. J., Hoogland, J., Jochemsen, H., & Strijbos, S. (1997). Profession, practice and profits: Competition in the core of health care system. Systems Research and Behavioral Science, 14(6), 409-421.
- Strijbos, Sytse, and Carl Mitcham. "Art.Systems and Systems Thinking." Carl Mitcham (Hg.):Encyclopedia of science, technology, and ethics, Thomson Gale (2005): 1880-1884.
- Strijbos, Sytse. "Ethics and the Systematic Character of Modern Technology." Techné: Research in Philosophy and Technology 3.4 (2012): 160-169.
- Strijbos S. 2010. "Systems thinking". In: The Oxford Handbook of Interdisciplinarity, Frodeman R, Thompson KJ, Mitcham C. (eds.). Oxford University: Oxford; p. 453–470.
