= Right to withdraw =

Concept in clinical research ethics

The right to withdraw is a concept in clinical research ethics that a study participant in a clinical trial has a right to end participation in that trial at will. According to ICH GCP guidelines, a person can withdraw from the research at any point in time and the participant is not required to reveal the reason for discontinuation.

== Children in research ==
When children participate in clinical research their parents or guardians must give assent for them to participate, but ethics dictate that even in this case it is best to get the consent of the research subject. Studies have shown that children participating in research have little understanding of the right to withdraw when they are presented with the option.

== Biobanks ==
Withdrawal from participating in biobank research is problematic for many reasons, including the fact that participant's data is often de-identified to grant research participant privacy.
