= Practitioner research =

Research conducted by people who work in the field being researched

Practitioner research refers to research and/or workplace research such as evaluation performed by individuals who also work in a professional field as opposed to being full-time academic researchers. Practitioner research developed as a recognized type of research in the last quarter of the 20th century. In this context, 'practitioner' means someone who delivers public services, such as a nurse, teacher, advice worker, probation officer, counselor or social worker. Practitioner research developed in disciplinary silos, but by the 2000s it had been recognized that all disciplines could approach practitioner research in broadly the same way.

== Benefits ==
For a practitioner, doing research alongside practice can assist with one or more of the following:

- Solving a specific problem, such as how to reduce crime on a particular housing estate.
- Contributing to the learning of a discipline such as education or social work.
- Influencing government policy, e.g. welfare or health policy.

It is also held to improve the quality of the practitioner-researcher's practice.

Practitioner research has two categories:

- Research in the workplace, such as a service evaluation or needs assessment;
- Academic research related to the practitioner's role, such as a master's degree or PhD in a relevant subject.

== See also ==
- Pracademic
