= Sander Griffioen =

Sander Griffioen (born 31 May 1941) is a Dutch philosopher, and Emeritus Professor for intercultural philosophy at the Vrije Universiteit in Amsterdam.

== Biography ==
Born in Loenen aan de Vecht, Griffioen studied at the Vrije Universiteit, where in 1971 he received his MA cum laude in Political economy, in 1975 another MA in Philosophy, and in 1976 his PhD cum laude with a thesis entitled "De roos en het kruis: De waardering van de eindigheid in het latere denken van Hegel" (The Rose and the Cross: The valuation of the finiteness in the later thought of Hegel).

Griffioen had joined the Vrije Universiteit faculty in 1971. From 1976 to 1979 he was Senior Member at the Toronto Institute for Christian Studies. Back at the Vrije Universiteit in 1979 he was appointed lector and teach philosophy from 1979 to 2002. From 1979 to 1991 he was also Professor for Calvinistic Philosophy at Leiden University. At the Vrije Universiteit in 2002 he was appointed Professor for Intercultural Philosophy until his retirement in 2006. Among his doctorate students was Sytse Strijbos (PhD in 1988).

== Selected publications ==
Books

- Griffioen, Sander. De roos en het kruis: De waardering van de eindigheid in het latere denken van Hegel. Phd thesis Vrije Universiteit. Assen: Van Gorcum. 1976
- Marshall, Paul A., Sander Griffioen, and Richard J. Mouw. Stained glass: Worldviews and social science. Univ Pr of Amer, 1989.
- Mouw, Richard J., and Sander Griffioen. Pluralisms and horizons: An essay in Christian public philosophy. WB Eerdmans, 1993.
- Griffioen, Sander, and Bert M. Balk. Christian Philosophy at the Close of the Twentieth Century. Holland., uitgeverij kok-Kampen (1995).

Articles, a selection:

- Griffioen, Sander. "De betekenis van Dooyeweerd’s Ontwikkelingsidee." Philosophia Reformata 51.1 (1986): 83-109.
- Griffioen, Sander. "The metaphor of the covenant in Habermas." Faith and Philosophy 8.4 (2009): 524-540.
