= Interagency Advisory Panel on Responsible Conduct of Research =

The Interagency Advisory Panel on Responsible Conduct of Research (PRCR) is a creation of the three research funding agencies of the Government of Canada: CIHR, NSERC and SSHRC.

The PRCR publishes the Tri-Agency Framework: Responsible Conduct of Research ("The Framework"). The PRCR collaborative objective is "to ensure a coherent and uniform approach for promoting responsible conduct of research and for addressing allegations of breaches of Tri-Agency Policies".

== RCR Framework ==
The Framework document "describes policies and requirements related to applying for and managing Agency funds, performing research, and disseminating results, and the processes that institutions and agencies follow in the event of an allegation of a breach of an Agency policy." Recipient of Tri-Agency funding are required to adhere to this framework and apply its own RCR policies to all research conducted under its jurisdiction as well as provide training opportunities.
