= National Research Ethics Service =

British ethics organisation

The National Research Ethics Service (NRES) is a UK medical quango which deals with research ethics. Principal Investigators must describe the experiment they intend to pursue to the NRES for its approval, failing which the study is prohibited.

== History ==
The NRES was launched on 1 April 2007.

The adjective "National" was omitted from the name at some unknown point in time.

== Purpose ==
In 2009, the NRES issued a leaflet in which it described its purpose:

The National Research Ethics Service (NRES) reviews research proposals to protect the rights and safety of research participants and enables ethical research which is of potential benefit to science and society.

== Substance of reports ==
The substance of the NRES reports can be gleaned from an approval obtained in 2011 by Stephanie Taylor, who was then Professor of Public Health and Primary Care at Queen Mary University of London.
