= Jon Van Til =

American sociologist

Jon Van Til is one of the pioneers in nonprofit organization research and education and the third sector, with particular interests in voluntary action, civil society and theories of the third sector. Dr. Van Til is Professor Emeritus of Urban Studies and Community Planning at Rutgers University, Camden.

He was born in 1939 in Columbus OH to Professor William Van Til and Beatrice (Blaha) Van Til. He is married to Agnes Kover-Van Til; and has two children from an earlier marriage: Ross Van Til of Louisville, Colorado and Claire Van Til of Philadelphia, Pennsylvania. Van Til received a BA (High Honors; Phi Beta Kappa) from Swarthmore College in Political Science in 1961 and an MA in Sociology from the University of North Carolina, Chapel Hill in 1963. He earned a Ph.D. in sociology from the University of California, Berkeley in 1970. His dissertation title is "Becoming Participants: Dynamics of Access Among the Welfare Poor". (Robert Blauner, advisor)

== Recent Work ==
His recent writings on social movements in Hungary are reported in two co-edited books and in contributed articles in the Huffington Post. Van Til divides his time between homes in Seelyville, Indiana and Budapest. He is married to Agnes Kover, the Hungarian human rights lawyer and sociologist.

Van Til is the past director of the Pennsylvania Law and Justice Institute (1972–1974), and served as Editor-in-Chief of Nonprofit and Voluntary Sector Quarterly from 1989 to 1992 (formerly the Journal of Voluntary Action Research from 1978 through 1989. He was twice elected President of the Association of Voluntary Action Scholars, and is the founding board chair of the Center for Nonprofit Corporations (Trenton, New Jersey). Van Til has also served as a Trustee of the George H. Gallup International Institute. Among the national clients of Van Til's consulting in the area of voluntary and nonprofit action have been the National Service Secretariat, the W.K. Kellogg Foundation, Health Visions Inc., the University of Colorado, the University of Pennsylvania, and the United Way of Central Indiana.

In 1991 he was recognized as "Creative Teacher of the Year" at Rutgers for developing his campus' program in Citizenship and Service Education. In 1994, he received the Career Award for Distinguished Research and Service from the Association for Research in Nonprofit Organizations and Voluntary Action.

Van Til was named Fulbright Distinguished Professor at the University of Ulster during the Spring term, 2004, serving in the Magee College's INCORE and Centre for Voluntary Action Studies. In the academic year 2005–6 he served as Fulbright Senior Specialist at INCORE.

Van Til served as Fulbright Specialist to Hungary's ELTE University for the academic year 2010–11, and at the Budapest University of Jewish Studies in 2014. He continues at that university at present, serving as visiting senior scholar and an active pracademic in the Budapest community. He also serves as senior visiting scholar at the Indiana University Lilly Family School of Philanthropy.

Van Til also served as President of the Philadelphia/Delaware Valley Chapter of the Fulbright Association, and as Anna Deane Carlson Distinguished Visiting Chair in Social Science at West Virginia University from 2003 to 2005. His biography has been included in Who's Who in America after 2006.

== Bibliography ==
=== Books ===
His twelve books include Van Til, Jon (2008). Breaching Derry's Walls. Growing Civil Society (2008, 2000), Mapping the Third Sector: Voluntarism in a Changing Social Economy; (1988), and Living With Energy Shortfall (1982).

=== Edited books ===
The Hungarian Patient co-edited with Peter Krasztev. Budapest and New York: Central European University Press. 2015.

Tarka Ellenallas. (The Colors Revolution), co-edited with Peter Krasztev. Budapest: Napvilag Kiadonal, 2013.

Resolving Community Conflicts and Problems: Public Deliberation and Sustained Dialogue. Columbia University Press, 2011 (co-edited with Roger A. Lohmann).

Gabor Hegyesi ’60—A Festschrift (co-edited with Andras Kelen). Budapest College of Management Press, 2008

Nonprofit Boards of Directors. co-edited with Robert Herman (Transaction Press, 1988)

Shifting the Debate: Public/Private Sector Relations in the Modern Welfare State. co-edited with Susan Ostrander and Stuart Langton (Transaction Press, 1987)

Leaders and Followers: Challenges for the Future., co-edited with Trudy Heller and Louis Zurcher (JAI Press, 1986.)

International Perspectives on Voluntary Action Research, co-edited with David Horton Smith. (University Press of America, 1982).

=== Encyclopedia and major handbook articles ===
“Grassroots Social Movements and the Shaping of History”, with Gabor Hegyesi and Jennifer Eschweiler. Ch. 23 in Ram Cnaan and Carl Milofsky, eds., Handbook of Community Movements and Local Organizations. New York: Springer. pp. 362–377. 2006.

"Civil Society", with Timothy Peterson. In Philanthropy in America: A Comprehensive Historical Encyclopedia, Dwight F. Burlingame, Editor. ABC-Clio. 2004.

"Utopian Thought in Philanthropy." In Philanthropy in America: A Comprehensive Historical Encyclopedia, Dwight F. Burlingame, Editor. ABC-Clio.

"Nonprofit Organizations and Social Institutions." Ch. 2 in Robert Herman, ed., The Jossey-Bass Handbook of Nonprofit Leadership and Management. second edition (San Francisco: Jossey-Bass). pp. 39–62.2002

"Voluntary Associations", with Arthur P. Williamson. In International Encyclopedia of the Social & Behavioral Sciences. Elsevier Science Ltd. 2001

“Change Leadership or Change Management?” With David A. Pettrone Swalve. Ch. 3 in Tracy Daniel Connors, ed., The Nonprofit Management Handbook: Management. Third edition (New York: Wiley). pp. 65–83.

"Metaphors and Visions for the Voluntary Sector." Ch. 1 in Tracy Daniel Connors, ed., The Volunteer Management Handbook. (New York: Wiley). 1995. pp. 3–11.

"National Service: Twenty Questions and Some Answers." Ch. 18 in Tracy Daniel Connors, ed., The Volunteer Management Handbook. (New York: Wiley). pp. 361–378. 1994

"Nonprofit Organizations and Social Institutions." Ch. 2 in Robert Herman, ed., The Jossey-Bass Handbook of Nonprofit Leadership and Management. (San Francisco: Jossey-Bass). pp. 44–64.

== General references ==
- Who's Who in America. 2015. 69th Edition (pub. 2014)
- Who's Who in American Education - 2004–2005, 6th Edition (pub. 2003)
- Who's Who in the East - 1989–1990, 22nd Edition (pub. 1988)
