= Carl Mitcham =

American philosopher (born 1941)

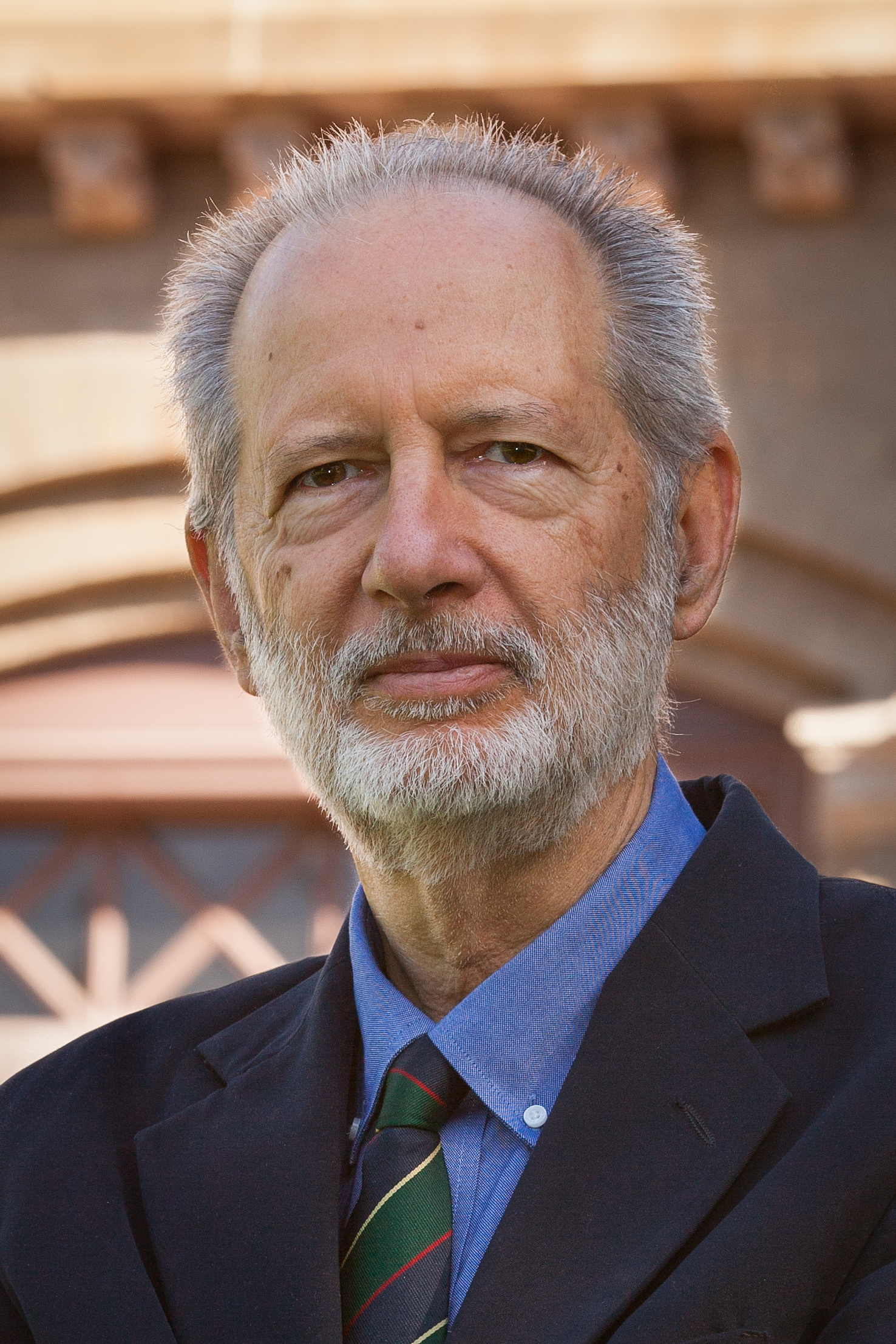
Carl Mitcham

Carl Mitcham (born 1941) is a philosopher of engineering and technology, Professor Emeritus of Humanities, Arts, and Social Sciences at the Colorado School of Mines and Visiting International Professor of Philosophy of Technology at Renmin University of China.

== Life and work ==
Mitcham was born in Texas and graduated from W. W. Samuell High School. He received his higher education from the University of Colorado Boulder (BA, MA) and Fordham University (PhD). Prior to the Colorado School of Mines, he held faculty appointments at Berea College (Kentucky), St. Catharine College (Kentucky), Brooklyn Polytechnic University (since merged with New York University), and Pennsylvania State University. He has also served in visiting positions at the Universidad de Puerto Rico, Mayagüez (1988), Universidad de Oviedo (1993), the Universities of Tilburg and Twente, Netherlands (1998), and as Fulbright Professor at the Universidad de País Vasco, Spain (2003–2004). From 1992 he began with increasing regularity to visit universities in China.

Mitcham was a selective political objector to the Vietnam War; although he was convicted of refusing military induction, he is not a pacifist.

While his disciplinary background was in philosophy, with an emphasis in philosophy and ethics of engineering, technology, and science, his scholarly publications have been as much interdisciplinary as disciplinary, especially insofar as he has worked to bring philosophy of technology into the interdisciplinary field of Science, Technology, and Society (STS) studies.

Mitcham's publications include Philosophy and Technology: Technology as a Philosophical Problem (with Robert Mackey, 1972), Theology and Technology: Essays in Christian Analysis and Exegesis (with Jim Grote, 1984), Thinking through Technology: The Path between Engineering and Philosophy (1994), Encyclopedia of Science, Technology, and Ethics (4 volumes, 2005; second edition with J. Britt Holbrook, Ethics, Science, Technology, Engineering: A Global Resource, 2015), Oxford Handbook of Interdisciplinarity (with Robert Frodeman and Julie Thompson Klein, 2010), Ethics and Science: An Introduction (with Adam Briggle, 2012), and Steps toward a Philosophy of Engineering: Historico-Philosophical and Critical Essays (2020). Publications have appeared in German, French, Spanish, Chinese, and other languages.

Mitcham was a founding member of the Society for Philosophy and Technology (1976). He also served as a member of the Committee on Scientific Freedom and Responsibility of the American Association for the Advancement of Science (1994–2000) and on expert study groups for the European Commission (2009 and 2012). Awards include the Abbot Payson Usher Prize of the Society for the History of Technology (1973), International World Technology Network (WTN) award for Ethics (2006), and a Doctorate Honoris Causa from the Universitat Internacional Valenciana, Spain (2010).

== Selected publications ==
Mitcham has authored and co-authored numerous publications. Books, a selection:

- Mitcham, Carl, and Robert Mackey, eds. Philosophy and technology. Free Press, 1972.
- Mitcham, Carl. Thinking through technology: The path between engineering and philosophy. University of Chicago Press, 1994.
- Frodeman, R., Klein, J.T., & Mitcham, C. (2010) The Oxford handbook of interdisciplinarity. Oxford: Oxford University Press, 2010.

Articles, a selection:

- Morse, Janice M., et al. "Concept analysis in nursing research: a critical appraisal." Research and Theory for Nursing Practice 10.3 (1996): pages 253–277.
- Hupcey, J. E., Penrod, J., Morse, J. M., & Mitcham, C. (2001). An exploration and advancement of the concept of trust. Journal of Advanced Nursing, 36(2), pages 282–293.
- Strijbos, Sytse, and Carl Mitcham. "Art.Systems and Systems Thinking." Carl Mitcham (Hg.):Encyclopedia of science, technology, and ethics, Thomson Gale (2005): pages 1880–1884.
- Fisher, Erik, Roop L. Mahajan, and Carl Mitcham. "Midstream modulation of technology: governance from within." Bulletin of Science, Technology & Society 26.6 (2006): pages 485–496.
