= European Charter for Researchers =

The European Charter for Researchers is a recommendation of good practice for researchers and employers and funders of researchers issued by the European Commission Directorate-General for Research. It sketches rights and duties of researchers and their funding institutions. It was published together with the Code of Conduct for the Recruitment of Researchers which outlines principles for hiring and appointing researchers. The document was compiled relying on extensive advice of researchers and research policy stakeholders. The European Commission described the European Charter for Researchers and the Code of Conduct for the Recruitment of Researchers as 'key elements in the European Union's policy to make research an attractive career, which is a vital feature of its strategy to stimulate economic and employment growth'. As of July 2020, 1000 European institutions had formally endorsed the charter, with little evidence for practical implementation.

== General principles and requirements applicable to researchers in the charter ==
- Intellectual freedom
- Adherence to recognised ethical practices
- Professional responsibility * Professional attitude (e.g. seeking necessary approvals before commencing research)
- Contractual and legal obligations (these should be fulfilled)
- Accountability (e.g. adhering to the principles of sound, transparent and efficient financial management)
- Good practice in research (e.g. reliable backing up of data)
- Dissemination and exploitation of results is promoted
- Public engagement is promoted
- Researchers should take advantage of available supervision in a structured way
- Senior researchers have a responsibility to manage and nurture younger researchers well
- Continual professional development is promoted

== General principles and requirements applicable to employers and funders ==
- Recognition of researchers as professionals on a career path (from postgraduate level upwards)
- Non-discrimination
- Research environment should be stimulating and safe
- Working conditions should be legal and flexible
- Stability and permanence of employment (implementing the principles of the EU Directive on Fixed-Term Work)
- Funding and salaries should be fair and attractive
- Gender balance ('employers and/or funders should aim for a representative gender balance at all levels of staff, including at supervisory and managerial level')
- Career development should be promoted
- Value of mobility should be recognised and promoted
- Access to research training and continuous development
- Access to career advice
- Intellectual property rights should be protected
- Co-authorship should be viewed positively
- Supervision should be provided for early stage researchers
- Teaching should be recognised as important, while not placing excessive burdens on researchers
- Evaluation/appraisal systems should be provided
- Complaints/appeals procedures should be provided
- Participation in decision-making bodies is promoted
- Recruitment should adhere to the Code of Conduct for the Recruitment of Researchers

== Code of Conduct for the Recruitment of Researchers ==
- Recruitment should be open, efficient and transparent
- Selection should be by balanced and trained panels
- Transparency of procedure for candidates
- Merit should be judged both qualitatively and quantitatively, balancing a good range of criteria
- Career breaks and other multidimensional career tracks should not be penalised
- Recognition of mobility experience
- Recognition of qualifications
- Seniority ('the levels of qualifications required should be in line with the needs of the position and not be set as a barrier to entry')
- Postdoctoral appointments should provide career development opportunities

== Aim and implementation ==
Given that legally the Charter and the Code are recommendations, the implementation of the documents was initially left to peer pressure. The Charter and the Code were described as serving as a quality certificate for research institutions. Where national or regional legislation gives researchers more favourable conditions than those provided by the Charter, the charter requested that the more favourable conditions not be diminished.

Implementation of the Researchers Charter was recommended not only by the European Commission, but also by research and science policy organisations including Eurodoc and Marie Curie Fellows Association.

== See also ==
- Directorate-General of the Joint Research Centre (European Commission)
- Directorate-General for Research (European Commission)
