= Science and Engineering Ethics =

- Discipline: Ethics
- Language: English
- Edited by: Dena K. Plemmons; Behnam Taebi

Publication details
- History: 1995–present
- Publisher: Springer Science+Business Media
- Frequency: Quarterly
- Impact factor: 2.275 (2018)

Standard abbreviations
- ISO 4: Sci. Eng. Ethics

Indexing
- CODEN: SEETF4
- ISSN: 1353-3452 (print); 1471-5546 (web)
- LCCN: 95037140 sn 95037140
- OCLC no.: 818986503

Links
- Journal homepage; Online archive

Science and Engineering Ethics is a quarterly peer-reviewed scientific journal covering ethics as it relates to science and engineering. It was established in 1995 by Opragen Publications and is currently published by Springer Science+Business Media. The editors-in-chief are Dena K. Plemmons (University of California, Riverside) and Behnam Taebi (TU Delft, the Netherlands). According to the Journal Citation Reports, the journal has a 2018 impact factor of 2.275.
