= Stateville Penitentiary Malaria Study =

1940s medical study in the United States

The Stateville Penitentiary malaria study was a controlled but ethically questionable study of the effects of malaria on prisoners of Stateville Penitentiary near Joliet, Illinois, in the 1940s, conducted by the Department of Medicine at the University of Chicago in conjunction with the United States Army and the State Department. The Stateville experiment was viewed as coercive because it offered shortened sentences to participants. The Green report was written about it by Andrew Conway Ivy in 1945 and used in the Nuremberg Doctors' Trial, which affected the Nuremberg Code, and to discuss how medical experimentation on prisoners should be carried out.

== Historical context ==
=== Demand for malaria research ===
The circumstances of World War II resulted in an urgent need for the development of new malaria treatments. First, U.S. soldiers were deployed to areas of the Pacific with extremely high rates of malaria infection. The U.S. Army estimated millions of man-hours lost due to malaria throughout the war; thus it was critically important to mitigate the effects of the disease in the interest of the military. Second, the conventional treatment for malaria, quinine, was largely unavailable throughout the war. Japanese control of the Philippines and Indonesia cut off the supply of quinine to the United States, adding to the need for alternate treatments. The new risks of malaria posed by World War II called for experimentation at an unprecedented scale, with a particular focus on human subjects.

=== Prison as a research center ===
The prison offered an environment conductive to controlled scientific experimentation on human subjects. The malaria experiments at Stateville Penitentiary are noteworthy for their utilization of this prison environment across all aspects of the experiments. A prison population allowed for researchers to limit extraneous variables across the subjects. Participants of the studies were exclusively white men, of similar age and health, which was the primary demographic of Stateville Penitentiary. The population of prisoners was also inherently homogenous in terms of behavior, due to the restrictions imposed by the maximum-security prison. Follow-up evaluations were possible for virtually all subjects of the study, since all had long-term sentences. Offers of parole reevaluation, as well as financial incentives, typically $25–100 for an experimental trial (adjusted for inflation, $460–1,860 in 2021), which yielded an exceptionally high availability of subjects willing to participate.

== Malaria Research Project ==
In 1944, the U.S. Committee on Medical Research formed a contract with the University of Chicago to test novel malaria treatments at the Stateville Penitentiary. Alf Alving, a nephrologist from the University of Chicago, directed the research and oversaw the formation of a clinical research division of the prison hospital. Alving worked with Ray Dern and Ernest Beutler, two physicians also from the University of Chicago.

The Malaria Research Project was primarily conducted on a floor of the prison hospital in the Stateville Penitentiary. The study aimed to understand the effect of various antimalarial drugs on relapses of malaria, primarily from the 8-aminoquinoline group of compounds. The study marked the first human test of the antimalarial drug primaquine. For the experiment, doctors from the University of Chicago bred Anopheles quadrimaculatus mosquitoes. The mosquitoes were infected with a Plasmodium vivax malaria strain that was isolated from a military patient. All five malaria strains are in the genus Plasmodium, protozoan parasites.

=== Experiments performed ===
The study considered the Chesson strain of P. vivax, sourced from a military patient infected in the Pacific. P. vivax, the predominant form of malaria in the Pacific, is associated with milder symptoms and unlike Plasmodium falciparum, it typically is not deadly. This strain was known for its resistance to the standard treatment of quinine, with frequent occurrences of relapse. Subjects at the prison maintained the strain via blood inoculations. For both control and test subjects, a constant number of mosquito bites from infected insects were administered; then, researchers dissected the mosquitoes to determine the intensity of the resultant infection.

The researchers tested patient responses to various potential treatments. The majority of these treatments had not yet been evaluated on humans, and their toxicity and potency was thus unknown. Most were 8-aminoquinoline compounds, analogs of pamaquine, an existing alternative to quinine that was unfavorable due to its higher toxicity. The researchers tested a wide range of doses, including some exceptionally high doses of treatments known to be toxic. The purpose of this was to establish a maximum margin of safety and to observe the manifestation of side effects. Thus, adverse side effects were intentionally caused to subjects, to demonstrate the possible worst-case reaction to extremely high-potency treatments. In one case, a subject died several days after he was injected with a high dosage of SN-8233, a potential treatment considered in the study.

=== Prisoner roles ===
The prison of the environment of the study created a unique and complex social dynamic, with prisoners involved in many aspects of the study, not only as subjects. A well-known participant of the study was Nathan Leopold, who (together with Richard Loeb, who was killed after being sentenced) kidnapped and murdered a teenager, while they were students at the University of Chicago. Serving his sentence at Stateville Penitentiary, Leopold took interest in the malaria studies, first enrolling as a subject. Throughout the experiment he assumed many other roles, recruiting subjects, observing experiments, serving as an X-ray technician, and dissecting mosquitoes. As a technician, he was assigned roles critical to the success of the research, and the flow of knowledge, communication, and resources critically depended on him at times. These accounts of his participation largely come from his autobiography Life Plus 99 Years, the factual accuracy of which is verified through reputable accounts of the study. While Leopold's range of roles was exceptional, numerous other prisoners assumed similar responsibilities in the experiments.

== Legacy of the study ==
The experiments were widely publicized, though in a controlled manner. In 1944, Life magazine documented the experiments with a photo series. Accounts of prisoner subjects were included, though these were allegedly scripted.

While a series of research publications came out of the Stateville Penitentiary experiments, the results had a minimal long-term impact on malaria treatment methods. The main legacy of the study is instead the ethical contention raised by prisoner experimentation, manifesting in the trials of Nazi Germany for its experiments on human subjects.

=== Nuremberg medical trial ===
In the 1946 Nuremberg trials in Germany, the International Military Tribunal prosecuted leaders of former Nazi Germany for war crimes and events of the Holocaust, in particular, experimentation on human subjects. The Stateville malaria experiments were used as a critical point of defense for the Nazis, who argued similarities between their prisoner experimentation and the United States' at Stateville Penitentiary.

Andrew Ivy, a physician from Chicago, testified as an expert witness in the trials. He was asked to differentiate Nazi malaria experiments at the Dachau concentration camp and the Stateville Penitentiary malaria experiments. There were key distinctions, such as a higher rate of subject fatalities and lack of voluntary consent in the Nazi experiments. However, the procedures, motives and premise of the studies were arguably similar.

The U.S. supported Ivy's claims of fundamental differences and publicized them as a justification for continuing the Stateville experiments. The international Nuremberg Code of human experimentation ethics, which resulted from the trials, contained clauses directly violated by the Stateville experiments. The U.S. never formally ratified the code, however, calling into question the ethics of prisoner experimentation and the Stateville Penitentiary malaria experiments in particular.

=== Effect on prisoner experimentation ===
Public opposition to medical experimentation on prisoners was scant during the war. The Green Report was published in the Journal of the American Medical Association and opened the door for legal, ethical experimentation on prisoners in the United States. Until later in the century, the medical community in the United States largely regarded the Nuremberg Code to be applicable to war criminals and not to the practices of U.S. researchers.

== See also ==
- Human experimentation in the United States
- List of medical ethics cases
- Research involving prisoners
- Tuskegee syphilis experiments
