= Nuremberg Code =

Principles for ethical human research

The Nuremberg Code (German: Nürnberger Kodex) is a set of ethical research principles for human experimentation created by the court in U.S. v Brandt, one of the Subsequent Nuremberg trials that were held after the Second World War.

Though it was articulated as part of the court's verdict in the trial, the Code would later become significant beyond its original context; in a review written on the 50th anniversary of the Brandt verdict, Jay Katz writes that "a careful reading of the judgment suggests that [the authors] wrote the Code for the practice of human experimentation whenever it is being conducted."

== Background ==
The origin of the Code began in pre–World War II German politics, particularly during the 1930s and 1940s. Starting in the mid-1920s, German physicians, usually proponents of racial hygiene, were accused by the public and the medical society of unethical medical practices. The use of racial hygiene was supported by the German government in order to promote an Aryan race. Racial hygiene extremists merged with National Socialism to promote the use of biology to accomplish their goals of racial purity, a core concept in the Nationalist ideology. Physicians were attracted to the scientific ideology and aided in the establishment of the National Socialist Physicians' League in 1929 to "purify the German medical community of 'Jewish Bolshevism'." Criticism was becoming prevalent; Alfons Stauder, member of the Reich Health Office, claimed that the "dubious experiments have no therapeutic purpose", and Fredrich von Muller, physician and the president of the Deutsche Akademie, joined the criticism.

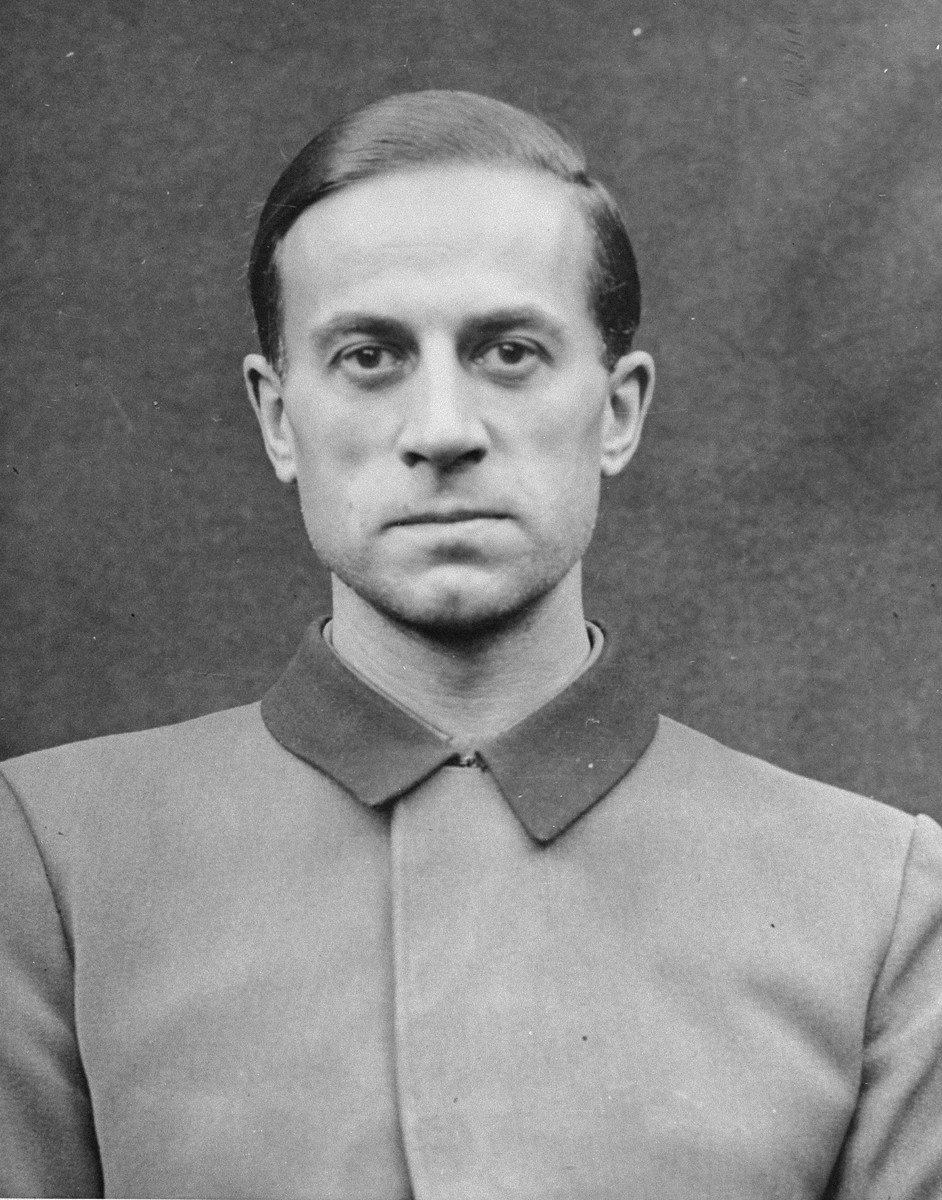
Karl Brandt, the chief defendant in the U.S. military tribunal that resulted in the Nuremberg Code

In response to the criticism of unethical human experimentation, the Weimar Republic (Germany's government from 1919 to 1933) issued "Guidelines for New Therapy and Human Experimentation". The guidelines were based on beneficence and non-maleficence, but also stressed the legal doctrine of informed consent. The guidelines clearly distinguished the difference between therapeutic and non-therapeutic research. For therapeutic purposes, the guidelines allowed administration without consent only in dire situations, but for non-therapeutic purposes any administration without consent was strictly forbidden. However, the guidelines from Weimar were negated by Adolf Hitler. By 1942, the Nazi party included more than 38,000 German physicians, who helped carry out medical programs such as the Law for the Prevention of Hereditarily Diseased Offspring.

After World War II, a series of trials were held to hold members of the Nazi party responsible for a multitude of war crimes. The trials were approved by President Harry Truman on 2 May 1945, and were led by the United States, Great Britain, and the Soviet Union. They began on 20 November 1945, in Nuremberg, Germany, in what became known as the Nuremberg trials. In the trial of USA v. Brandt, which became known as the "Doctors' Trial", German physicians responsible for conducting unethical medical procedures on humans during the war were tried. They focused on physicians who conducted inhumane and unethical human experiments in concentration camps, in addition to those who were involved in over 3.5 million sterilizations of German citizens.

Several of the accused argued that their experiments differed little from those used before the war, and that there was no law that differentiated between legal and illegal experiments. This worried Andrew Ivy and Leo Alexander, who worked with the prosecution during the trial. In April 1947, Alexander submitted a memorandum to the United States Counsel for War Crimes outlining six points for legitimate medical research.

An early version of the Code known as the Memorandum, which stated explicit voluntary consent from patients is required for human experimentation, was drafted on 9 August 1947. On 20 August 1947, the judges delivered their verdict against Karl Brandt and 22 others. The verdict reiterated the Memorandum's points and, in response to expert medical advisers for the prosecution, revised the original six points of the Memorandum to ten points. The ten points became known as the Code, which includes such principles as informed consent and absence of coercion; properly formulated scientific experimentation; and beneficence towards experiment participants. It is thought to have been mainly based on the Hippocratic Oath, which was interpreted as endorsing the experimental approach to medicine while protecting the patient.

=== Authorship "controversy" ===
The Code was initially ignored, but gained much greater significance about 20 years after it was written. As a result, there were substantial rival claims for the creation of the Code. Some claimed that Harold Sebring, one of the three U.S. judges who presided over the Doctors' trial, was the author. Leo Alexander, MD and Andrew Ivy, MD, the prosecution's chief medical expert witnesses, were also each identified as authors. In his letter to Maurice Henry Pappworth, an English physician and the author of the 1967 book Human Guinea Pigs, Andrew Ivy claimed sole authorship of the code. Leo Alexander, approximately 30 years after the trial, also claimed sole authorship. However, after careful reading of the transcript of the Doctors' trial, background documents, and the final judgements, it is more accepted that the authorship was shared and the code grew out of the trial itself.

== The ten points of the Nuremberg Code ==
The ten points of the code were given in the section of the judges' verdict entitled "Permissible Medical Experiments":

1. The voluntary consent of the human subject is absolutely essential. This means that the person involved should have legal capacity to give consent; should be so situated as to be able to exercise free power of choice, without the intervention of any element of force, fraud, deceit, duress, overreaching, or other ulterior form of constraint or coercion; and should have sufficient knowledge and comprehension of the elements of the subject matter involved as to enable him to make an understanding and enlightened decision. This latter element requires that before the acceptance of an affirmative decision by the experimental subject there should be made known to him the nature, duration, and purpose of the experiment; the method and means by which it is to be conducted; all inconveniences and hazards reasonably to be expected; and the effects upon his health or person which may possibly come from his participation in the experiment. The duty and responsibility for ascertaining the quality of the consent rests upon each individual who initiates, directs, or engages in the experiment. It is a personal duty and responsibility which may not be delegated to another with impunity.
2. The experiment should be such as to yield fruitful results for the good of society, unprocurable by other methods or means of study, and not random and unnecessary in nature.
3. The experiment should be so designed and based on the results of animal experimentation and a knowledge of the natural history of the disease or other problem under study that the anticipated results will justify the performance of the experiment.
4. The experiment should be so conducted as to avoid all unnecessary physical and mental suffering and injury.
5. No experiment should be conducted where there is an a priori reason to believe that death or disabling injury will occur; except, perhaps, in those experiments where the experimental physicians also serve as subjects.
6. The degree of risk to be taken should never exceed that determined by the humanitarian importance of the problem to be solved by the experiment.
7. Proper preparations should be made and adequate facilities provided to protect the experimental subject against even remote possibilities of injury, disability, or death.
8. The experiment should be conducted only by scientifically qualified persons. The highest degree of skill and care should be required through all stages of the experiment of those who conduct or engage in the experiment.
9. During the course of the experiment the human subject should be at liberty to bring the experiment to an end if he has reached the physical or mental state where continuation of the experiment seems to him to be impossible.
10. During the course of the experiment the scientist in charge must be prepared to terminate the experiment at any stage, if he has probable cause to believe, in the exercise of the good faith, superior skill and careful judgment required of him that a continuation of the experiment is likely to result in injury, disability, or death to the experimental subject.

== Importance ==
The Code has not been officially accepted as law by any nation or as official ethics guidelines by any association. In fact, the Code's reference to Hippocratic duty to the individual patient and the need to provide information was not initially favored by the American Medical Association. Katz observes that the Western world initially dismissed the Nuremberg Code as a "code for barbarians, but unnecessary (or superfluous) for ordinary physicians." Additionally, the final judgment did not specify whether the Code should be applied to cases such as political prisoners, convicted felons, and healthy volunteers. The lack of clarity, the brutality of the unethical medical experiments, and the uncompromising language of the Code created an image that it was designed for singularly egregious transgressions.

However, the Code is considered by some to be the most important document in the history of clinical research ethics, because of its massive influence on global human rights. In the United States, the Code and the related Declaration of Helsinki influenced the drafting of regulations promulgated by the United States Department of Health and Human Services to ensure ethical treatment of human research subjects, known as the Common Rule, which is now codified in Part 46 of Title 45 of the Code of Federal Regulations. These regulations are enforced by Institutional Review Boards (IRBs). In 1966, the International Covenant on Civil and Political Rights was adopted by the United Nations, and after enough nations had ratified the Covenant, it came into force on 23 March 1976. Article Seven prohibits experiments conducted without the "free consent to medical or scientific experimentation" of the subject. As of September 2019, the Covenant has 173 states parties.

In his 2014 review, Gaw observes that the Code "not only entered the legal landscape, but also became the prototype for all future codes of ethical practice across the globe." The idea of free or informed consent also served as the basis for International Ethical Guidelines for Biomedical Research Involving Human Subjects proposed by the World Health Organization. Another notable symposium review was published by the Medical University of Vienna in 2017: "Medical Ethics in the 70 Years after the Nuremberg Code, 1947 to the Present". President and Rector Markus Muller writes in his introduction that the Code "constitutes one of the most important milestones in the history of medicine, providing for the first time a proper framework for research on human subjects. This milestone was not a voluntary, precautionary measure, but only came into existence in the aftermath of Nazi atrocities. The Nuremberg Code became a cornerstone of clinical research and bioethics."

In 1995, United States District Judge Sandra Beckwith ruled that the Nuremberg Code may be applied in criminal and civil litigation in the federal courts of the United States.

== See also ==
- Belmont Report
- Civil and political rights
- Declaration of Geneva
- Declaration of Helsinki
- Good clinical practice
- Green report
- Hippocratic Oath
- Human rights
- Human subject research
- Medical ethics
- Medical torture
- Nuremberg principles
- Unit 731
- The Hague Ethical Guidelines
- Unethical human experimentation in the United States
- Universal Declaration of Human Rights
- World Medical Association
