= Alma Levant Hayden =

American chemist (1927–1967)

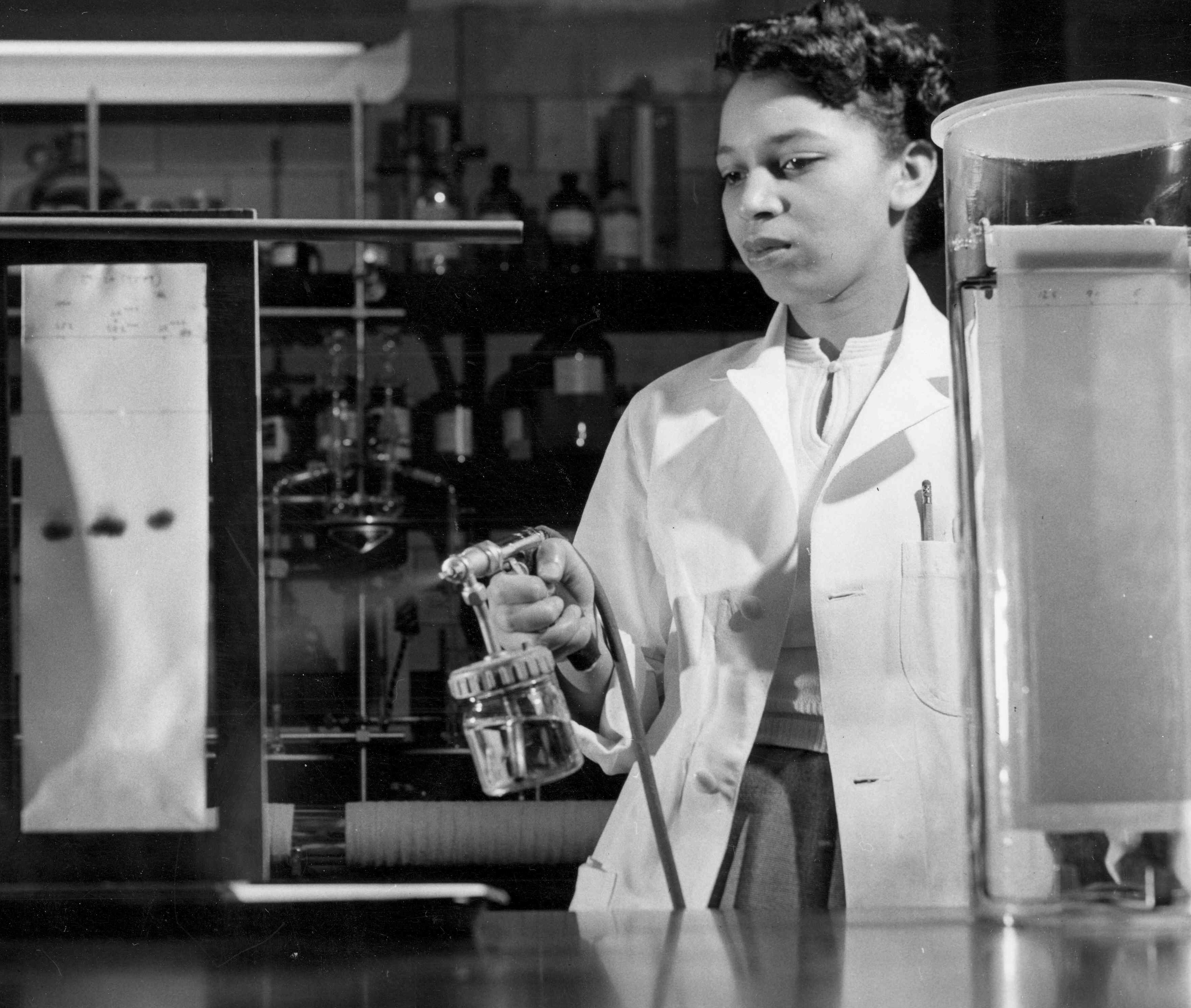
- Alma L. Hayden, 1952 at NIH
- Born: Alma Levant; March 30, 1927; Greenville, South Carolina, US
- Died: August 2, 1967 (aged 40)
- Education: South Carolina State College; Howard University
- Known for: Exposing chemical composition of Krebiozen
- Scientific career
- Fields: Chemistry
- Workplaces: National Institutes of Health (NIH); Food and Drug Administration (FDA)

Alma Levant Hayden (March 30, 1927 – August 2, 1967) was an American chemist, and one of the first African-American women to gain a scientist position at a science agency in Washington, D.C. She joined the National Institutes of Health (NIH) in the 1950s. Hayden graduated from Howard University with a master's degree in chemistry, and became an expert in spectrophotometry. She published work on infrared and other techniques for analyzing chemicals in a range of journals. Hayden was appointed Chief of the Spectrophotometer Research Branch in the Division of Pharmaceutical Chemistry at the U.S. Food and Drug Administration (FDA) in 1963, and may have been the first African-American scientist at the FDA. Hayden came to national attention in 1963 when she led the team that exposed the common substance in Krebiozen, a long-controversial alternative and expensive drug promoted as anti-cancer.

== Education ==
Alma Levant was born in Greenville, South Carolina, on March 30, 1927 and graduated with honors in 1947 from South Carolina State College, a historically black college in Orangeburg, South Carolina. Originally planning to be a nurse, she found herself so interested in chemistry that she "just didn't want to part from it". She gained a master's degree in chemistry from Howard University.

== Career ==
Hayden joined the National Institute of Arthritis and Metabolic Diseases at the NIH. The above photograph was taken there in 1952, showing her working with a technique called paper chromatography, spraying reagent on liquids dropped onto paper to detect precursors to steroids.

In the mid-1950s Hayden moved to the FDA, where she may have been the first person of color to work at the Agency. There had reportedly been a reluctance to employ African-Americans there because scientific officers may have to give testimony in courts, and there was concern about how this would be received in some parts of the U.S. In 1963, Hayden became Chief of the Spectrophotometer Research Branch in the Division of Pharmaceutical Chemistry.

In 1962 in the wake of the Thalidomide tragedy, the Kefauver Harris Amendment increased the FDA's role in ensuring drug safety. With these provisions in place, the FDA sought to identify the ingredients in Krebiozen, a controversial and expensive alternative cancer treatment. Hayden assigned students in her branch the task of seeing whether spectrometer images of Krebiozen matched any of the 20,000 alphabetically-listed images on file at the FDA. On September 3, 1963, a likely match was quickly found in the "C"s: a common substance, creatine. It occurs in the body at a far higher level than contained in Krebiozen, and had been shown to have no impact on cancer in animals.

Spectrophotometry and crystallography studies were conducted independently by three teams, including scientists from MIT. The discovery was announced at a press conference. Hayden's report is detailed in the U.S. Congressional Record. Hayden testified at the lengthy criminal trial of the promoters of Krebiozen, Stevan Durovic and Andrew C. Ivy.

== Selected publications ==
- Heftmann E, Hayden Al. Paper chromatography of steroid sapogenins and their acetates. J Biol Chem 1952;197(1): 47–55.
- Hayden AL, Heftmann E, Johnson DF. Determination of individual adrenocortical steroids in urine. Acta Endocrinol (Copenh) 1956;23(4):341–356.
- Hayden AL, Sammul OR. Infrared analysis of pharmaceuticals. 1. Application of the potassium bromide disk technique to some steroids, alkaloids, barbiturates, and other drugs. J Am Pharm Assoc Am Pharm Assoc 1960;49:489–496.
- Hayden AL, Sammul OR. Infrared analysis of pharmaceuticals. 2. A study of the cinchona alkaloids in potassium bromide disks. J Am Pharm Assoc Am Pharm Assoc 1960;49:497–502.
- Hayden AL. Infrared analysis of pharmaceuticals. III. Identification and determination of adrenocortical steroids, barbiturates, and sulfonamides from paper chromatograms. J Pharm Sci 1960; 51: 617–622.
- Hayden AL, Sammul OR, Selzer GB. Infrared, ultraviolet, and visible absorption spectra of some USP and NF reference standards and their derivatives. Association of Official Agricultural Chemists, 1962; 45: 797–900.
- Hayden AL, Brannon WL, Craig NR. A micro-extraction technique with compounds isolated from thin-layer chromatograms. J Pharm Sci 1968: 57(5): 858–860.

== Personal life ==
Hayden married a fellow NIH research chemist, Alonzo R. Hayden. Alonzo Hayden was from West Virginia, with a PhD from the University of Wisconsin. He had also undertaken postgraduate studies at Howard University, and worked at the NIH from 1952 to 1958. Alonzo also worked in the US Department of Agriculture for the research facility in Beltsville, MD.

The Haydens had two children, Michael and Andrea. Alma Hayden died of cancer on August 2, 1967. She loved doing science throughout her life.
