= Abdulhamid Isa Dutse =

Nigerian academic (1960–2020)

Chief Medical Director Aminu Kano Teaching Hospital
- In office 2003–2011

Secretary to the state Governor Jigawa State
- In office 1992–1994
- Governor: Ali Sa'ad Birnin-Kudu

Personal details
- Born: 28 December 1960 Kano State
- Died: 5 October 2020 (aged 59) Kano State
- Education: Ahmadu Bello University Zaria
- Profession: Professor

Abdulhamid Isa Dutse (28 December 1960 – 5 October 2020) was a Nigerian Cardiologist, and consultant, who was Professor of Medicine, and the former chief medical director of Aminu Kano Teaching Hospital (AKTH).

== Early life and education ==
Abdulhamid was born in December 1960 at Unguwar Gini, Kano Municipal Local Government Area of Kano State. He attended Kwalli Special Primary School, Kano in 1966 and he later joined Magwan Primary School. He also attended Rumfa College, Kano between 1972 and 1977, and graduated from Ahmadu Bello University Zaria as a Medical Doctor in 1982.

== Career ==
Abdulhamid started his career as a young Lecturer up to Senior registrar at Ahmadu Bello University Zaria between 1984 and 1987. He worked with Lagos State University between 1987 and 1988, and in 1989 he worked in the United Kingdom with St Bartholomew's Hospital and the Hammer Smith Hospital.

He was the consultant in Kano State working with state hospitals Murtala Muhammad Specialist Hospital and Muhammad Abdullahi Wase Teaching Hospital between 1989 and 1992.

He was appointed the Commissioner of Health in Jigawa State by Governor Ali Sa'ad Birnin-Kudu between 1992 and 1994 where he Joined Aminu Kano Teaching Hospital in 1994. Abdulhamid was the supervisor of Pfizer's drug experiment on desperately ill children in 1996 (Abdullahi v. Pfizer, Inc.).

He was Appointed Dean Faculty of Medicine, Bayero University Kano in 1998 and he was the chief medical director of Aminu Kano Teaching Hospital (AKTH) between 2003 and 2011. He also worked with King Faisal Specialist Hospital and Research Centre, Riyadh, Kingdom of Saudi Arabia.

Abdulhamid was instrumental to the first kidney transplant in a public hospital, and he authored many publications on health related issues.

== Death ==
Abdulhamid died on 5 October 2020 after a brief illness in Kano State, Nigeria
