= Abdurrahman Abba Sheshe =

Nigerian consultant and surgeon

Professor Abdurrahman Abba Sheshe
- Born: Abdurrahman Abba; 27 March, 1965; Kano State, Sheshe
- Citizenship: Kano state
- Education: Bayero University, Kano
- Occupation: Medical doctor (Surgeon)
- Title: Professor

Abdurrahman Abba Sheshe (born 27 March 1965) is a Nigerian consultant surgeon and a fellow of the National Postgraduates College of Surgeons. He is currently the chief medical director of the Aminu Kano Teaching Hospital (AKTH).

== Early life and education ==
Abdurrahman Sheshe was born in 1965 at Sheshe quarters, Kano State. He completed his elementary education at Madatai Special Primary School, Government Secondary School Gwale, and also Rumfa College, all in Kano State. In 1986, he gained admission into Bayero University, Kano for his pre-clinical studies. He proceeded to the University of Benin where he obtained a Bachelor of Medicine and Surgery (MBBS) degree in 1991. He completed his residency in 1997 at the Bayero University Teaching Hospital (now AKTH).

== Career ==
In 2023, President Bola Tinubu reappointed Abdurrahman Abba Sheshe as the Chief Medical Director of Aminu Kano Teaching Hospital, Kano, for a second term of four years, the new term took effect from 5 December, 2023. He served as both deputy chairman and chairman, Medical Advisory Committee.
