= Abdullahi v. Pfizer, Inc. =

Kano trovafloxacin trial litigation

The Kano trovafloxacin trial litigation arose out of a clinical trial conducted by the pharmaceutical company Pfizer in 1996 in Kano, Nigeria, during an epidemic of meningococcal meningitis. To test its new antibiotic, trovafloxacin (Trovan), Pfizer gave 100 children trovafloxacin, while another 100 received the gold-standard anti-meningitis treatment, ceftriaxone, a cephalosporin antibiotic. Pfizer gave the children a substantially reduced dose of the ceftriaxone (specifically, 33 mg/kg) relative to that described on the US FDA-approved prescribing information. The allegation is that this was done to skew the test in favor of its own drug. Pfizer claimed that the dose used was sufficient.

Five children given trovafloxacin died, as did six of those given ceftriaxone. The lead investigator, Abdulhamid Isa Dutse, later provided a letter of approval for human trials that was found to be falsified. The Nigerian government called the trial "an illegal trial of an unregistered drug". It has been alleged that participants and their families were not told that they were part of a trial, and that Médecins Sans Frontières was offering the standard treatment in another part of the same building. Pfizer acknowledged reducing the dose of the standard treatment, but said this was done to minimize injection-site pain and that the mortality rates in both the trovafloxin and ceftriaxone arms of its trial were lower than among those treated with chloramphenicol by Médecins Sans Frontières.

The survivors of the trial tried to bring a number of legal actions against Pfizer in the United States. These resulted in four judicial opinions, the first three dismissing the claims on procedural grounds. According to Ben Goldacre, Pfizer argued that it was not required to obtain informed consent for experimental drug trials in Africa, and that any case should be heard in Nigeria. In May 2006, Representative Tom Lantos of California, the senior Democrat on the House International Relations Committee, described the findings of a report compiled about the case by the Nigerian government as "absolutely appalling" and called for Pfizer to open its records. In January 2009, the United States Court of Appeals for the Second Circuit ruled that the Nigerian victims and their families were entitled to bring suit against Pfizer in the United States under the Alien Tort Statute. Pfizer subsequently settled the case out of court with a $75 million settlement that was subject to a confidentiality clause.

Overall, the 1996 meningitis epidemic in northern Nigeria killed about 12,000 people, during the worst known meningitis outbreak in Sub-Saharan Africa.

== Abdullahi v. Pfizer, Inc. I ==
Nigeria's position on the African continent

Chemical structure of trovafloxacin

In 2002, a group of Nigerian minors and their guardians sued Pfizer in the United States District Court for the Southern District of New York. Plaintiffs alleged that "they suffered grave injuries from an experimental antibiotic administered by defendant Pfizer Inc. (Pfizer) without their informed consent". On 29 August 2001, plaintiffs brought this action under the Alien Tort Statute, 28 U.S.C. § 1350, to recover damages for Pfizer's alleged violations of the Nuremberg Code, the Declaration of Helsinki, the International Covenant on Civil and Political Rights and customary international law (otherwise known as the "law of nations").

The District Court summarized the Nigerian plaintiffs’ allegations as follows:

In the mid-1990s, Pfizer developed Trovafloxacin Mesylate, an antibiotic that is also known by its brand name as "Trovan". Pfizer projected that its total annual sales could exceed $ 1 billion a year. (Compl. P 96.) Beginning in 1996, Pfizer conducted the largest drug testing program ever undertaken by enrolling thousands of participants in clinical tests. (Compl. P 97.) However, prior animal testing indicated that Trovan might cause significant side effects in children such as joint disease, abnormal cartilage growth (osteochondrosis, a disease resulting in bone deformation) and liver damage. (Compl. PP 98-99.)

In 1996, epidemics of bacterial meningitis, measles and cholera besieged the impoverished Nigerian city of Kano. (Compl. PP 2, 5, 101.) In April 1996, six weeks after it first learned of the epidemics, Pfizer dispatched a medical team to establish a treatment center at Kano's Infectious Disease Hospital (IDH). (Compl. PP 2, 8, 101-02, 101-07, 109.)

In addition to Pfizer team, humanitarian organizations such as Medecins Sans Frontieres (MSF), also known as Doctors Without Borders, traveled to Kano's IDH to treat the sick. (Compl. P 5.) The medical teams operated under squalid conditions in a hospital consisting of several single story cinder block buildings, some of which lacked electricity and running water. (Compl. P 110.) The beds were filled to capacity and patients seeking care overflowed on to the hospital's grounds. (Compl. P 110.) Plaintiffs allege that while MSF and other organizations offered safe and effective treatments for bacterial meningitis, Pfizer embarked on a medical experiment involving the "new, untested and unproven" antibiotic "Trovan". (Compl. PP 2-3, 6, 8, 95.)

To travel to Kano, Pfizer needed the U.S. Food and Drug Administration's (FDA) authorization to export Trovan. On 15 March 1996, Pfizer informed the FDA of its intent to conduct the Kano study. (Compl. P 108.) Thereafter, Pfizer obtained a 20 March letter from the Nigerian government and a 28 March letter from IDH's ethics committee permitting Pfizer to export Trovan to Kano. (Compl. P 108.) Although both letters predate Pfizer's departure for Kano, plaintiffs allege that no IDH ethics committee existed as of 28 March 1996 and that the 28 March letter was back-dated in response to a 1997 FDA audit. (Compl. PP 132-33.) [When confronted with evidence that the 28 March letter was in fact back-dated, Pfizer issued a public statement that the letter was "incorrect".]

Plaintiffs further contend that Pfizer's sole purpose for traveling to Kano was to expedite the FDA's approval of Trovan to treat pediatric victims. (Compl. P 7.) Prior to Kano, only one child had ever been treated with Trovan, and then only after all other antibiotics failed. No child had ever received it orally. (Compl. P 105-06.) According to plaintiffs, Nigerian officials allocated to Pfizer two of IDH's wards to conduct the testing. (Compl. P 113.) Pfizer selected, from lines of those awaiting treatment, children ranging in age from one to thirteen years who exhibited symptoms of neck stiffness, joint stiffness, and high fevers with headaches. (Compl. P 3, 115.) Pfizer divided them into two groups and treated half with Trovan. (Compl. P 3.) The other half was "purposefully 'low-dosed'" with ceftriaxone, an FDA-approved drug shown to be effective in treating meningitis. (Compl. P 125.) In order to enhance the comparative results of Trovan, Pfizer administered only one-third of ceftriaxone's recommended dosage. (Compl. P 3, 124-25.)

Meanwhile, MSF established their headquarters in tents beside the IDH due to space constraints. (Compl. P 111.) There, MSF admitted their sickest patients to hospital beds in the IDH and confined the less ill to floor mats in their tents. (Compl. P 112.) MSF treated pediatric meningitis patients with chloramphenicol, a drug recommended by the World Health Organization to treat bacterial meningitis in epidemic situations. (Compl. PP 11, 111.)

Pfizer's protocol also called for the children selected to have their blood tested on arrival and five days later. (Compl. P 126.) If a child was not responding well to Trovan, Pfizer switched his or her treatment to ceftriaxone. (Compl. P 126.) Plaintiffs allege, however, that Pfizer neglected to analyze the patients' blood samples and therefore could not determine if a patient had a negative reaction until the manifestation of a visible and permanent injury. (Compl. P 126.) Plaintiffs further allege that low-dosing ceftriaxone resulted in injuries and deaths among the control group. (Compl. P 3.)

Although Pfizer's protocol called for its team to obtain consent from the parents of the children treated who were too young to sign, few parents could speak or read English. (Compl. P 127.) Plaintiffs claim that Pfizer failed to explain to the children's parents that the proposed treatment was experimental, that they could refuse it, or that other organizations offered more conventional treatments at the same site free of charge. (Compl. PP 3, 117-20, 128-30, 154-55, 157.) After two weeks, the Pfizer team left Kano and never returned for follow-up evaluations. (Compl. P 122.) Plaintiffs allege that five children who received Trovan and six children whom Pfizer "low-dosed" died. (Compl. P 120.) Others suffered paralysis, deafness and blindness. (Compl. PP 16-50.)

On 30 December 1996, Pfizer applied for FDA approval to market Trovan in the United States for various uses including the treatment of pediatric infectious diseases. (Compl. P 216.) In June 1997, FDA inspectors discovered inconsistencies in the data resulting from Pfizer's Kano treatments. (Compl. P 217.) Thereafter, regulators informed Pfizer that they planned to deny its application to use the drug against epidemic meningitis and expressed several concerns including Pfizer's failure to conduct follow-up examinations. In response, Pfizer withdrew its application. (Compl. P 217.)

On 18 February 1998, Pfizer launched Trovan after it received FDA authorization for treatment of a number of adult illnesses. (Compl. P 218.) Shortly thereafter, Pfizer and the FDA received reports regarding Trovan patients suffering liver damage. (Compl. P 219.)

In January 1999, the FDA recommended that Trovan be prescribed only for patients in nursing homes or hospitals suffering from life-threatening conditions. (Compl. P 223.) That following June, the FDA issued a public health advisory on liver toxicity associated with oral and intravenous Trovan following post-marketing reports of acute liver failure strongly associated with the drug. (Compl. P 224.) The FDA announced that it received reports of more than 100 cases where Trovan patients exhibited clinically symptomatic liver toxicity and advised physicians to use Trovan only for patients who met certain criteria. (Compl. P 224-25.) In addition, Pfizer agreed to limit distribution of Trovan to hospitals and long term nursing facilities. (Compl. P 224.) Further, the European Union's Committee for Proprietary Medicinal Products suspended all sales of Trovan in part due to results from the Kano tests. (Compl. PP 221-22.)

In response to plaintiffs' allegations, Pfizer filed a motion to dismiss, pursuant to Rule 12(b)(6) of the Federal Rules of Civil Procedure, alleging that the Plaintiffs' fail to plead a violation of the law of nations, because their actions did not fit the narrow exceptions when a private party will be held liable for the "law of nations". However, the court denied the motion to dismiss on the grounds, because the complaint sufficiently alleged that Pfizer had worked in concert with the Nigeria government, thereby Pfizer acted as a "de facto state actor".

Next, Pfizer sought dismissal on grounds of forum non conveniens. Despite the plaintiff's claims that the Nigerian court system is corrupt and could not provide an adequate alternative forum, the court ultimately found that Nigeria did provide an adequate alternative forum and the "Gilbert factors" weighted in favor of transferring the case to Nigeria. Accordingly, the court granted the defendant's motion to dismiss this action on grounds of forum non conveniens, provided Pfizer consented to suit and acceptance of process in Nigeria; Pfizer waived possible statute of limitation problems; Pfizer made available documents and employees, and; Pfizer agreed to return to the United States if Nigeria declined to accept jurisdiction.

== Abdullahi v. Pfizer, Inc. II ==
United States Court of Appeals.

The Nigerian Plaintiffs appealed from the District Court's order of final judgment to the United States Court of Appeals for the Second Circuit. Pfizer cross-appealed denial of its motion to dismiss pursuant to Rule 12(b)(6) of the Federal Rules of Civil Procedure. The Court of Appeals reviewed the forum non conveniens dismissal under the "clear abuse of discretion" standard. The Court of Appeals, however, revisited the Court's analysis of the adequate alternative forum. While under normal circumstances Nigeria appeared to be an adequate forum, in rare cases this may not be enough. "If the plaintiff shows that conditions in the foreign forum plainly demonstrate that plaintiffs are highly unlikely to obtain basic justice, a defendant's forum non conveniens motion must be denied". The Court of Appeals noted that plaintiffs had submitted a number of affidavits from State Department and United Nations officials to buttress their claims about corruption in the Nigerian judiciary.

Next, the Court of Appeals acknowledged that on appeal both parties had requested judicial notice of facts contained within the record of a parallel proceeding, involving different plaintiffs, in a Nigerian Court. The Court of Appeals referred to the Nigerian litigation as Zango v. Pfizer (Zango litigation). The Zango litigation had recently been dismissed in Nigeria. The court declined to take judicial notice of the "Zango litigation", instead opting to vacate the district court's dismissal on grounds of forum non conveniens and remanding the case to the district court to consider the implications of the "Zango litigation" on its forum non conveniens analysis.

For these reasons, the Court of Appeals vacated and remanded to the District Court.

== Abdullahi v. Pfizer, Inc. III ==
After the Court of Appeals vacated and remanded, the District Court readdressed the dual grounds for dismissal, both dismissal pursuant to Rule 12(b)(6) of the Federal Rules of Civil Procedure and dismissal pursuant to the doctrine of forum non conveniens. On remand, the District Court granted Pfizer's dismissal under Rule 12(b)(6) and found that the Zango litigation did not preclude dismissal for forum non conveniens.

=== Adequate Alternative Forum Analysis ===
After setting forth the factual and procedural background the District Court turned its attention to the Zango litigation. The court's somewhat searching review of the Zango litigation came in direct response to the Court of Appeals holding, which questioned whether Nigeria was in fact an adequate alternative forum, because the "Zango litigation" had ended in dismissal. The District Court discussed the "Zango litigation"'s procedural history, concluding that the Plaintiffs’ filed a Notice of Discontinuance, based upon the Federal High Court, "having declined jurisdiction in this matter for personal reasons".

Next, the court addressed the Plaintiff's allegations of corruption within the Nigerian judiciary. Although Plaintiff's provided allegations of corruption and anecdotal evidence, the court ultimately held that Plaintiffs were unable to establish corruption and bias in the "Zango litigation". Finding instead, that dismissal was a result of the Plaintiff's waiting "endlessly for a new judge to replace Judge Hobon", who had recused himself for personal reasons. For these reasons, the District Court, again found that Nigeria provided an adequate alternative forum.

=== Applying Sosa ===
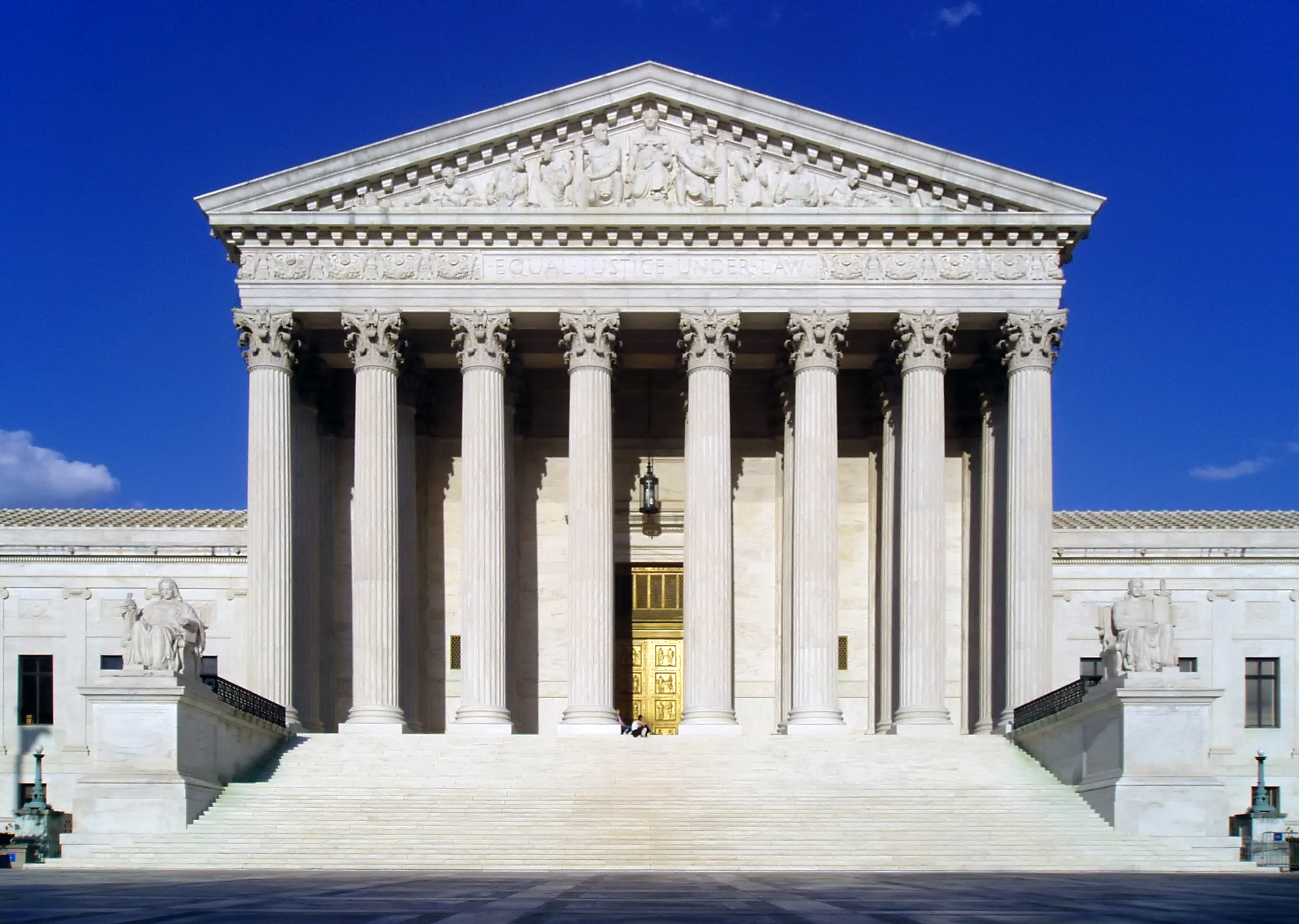
U.S. Supreme Court building

In finding that dismissal was also appropriate under for lack of subject matter jurisdiction, which the court mistakenly refers to as Federal Rule of Civil Procedure 12(b)(6), the court relied heavily upon Sosa. Under Sosa, the Alien Tort Claims Act creates no new causes of action but confers on federal courts the power to hear a narrow set of alien tort claims for violations of international law. However, the Supreme Court did leave the door open for courts, exercising a vigorous gatekeeping function, to recognized new actionable rules based on evolving principles of international law. However, "federal courts should require any claim based on the present-day law of nations to rest on a norm of international character accepted by the civilized world and defined with a specificity comparable to the features of the 18th-century paradigms". Having set forth the relevant standard, the court evaluated whether Pfizer did in fact violate customary international law. First, the District Court found that the Nuremberg Code, which governs scientific research on human subjects, does not contain a private cause of action. Second, the District Court found that the Declaration of Helsinki and the CIOMS guidelines does not contain a private cause of action. Instead, finding these guidelines are merely a "general statement of policy that is unlikely to give rise to obligations in any strict sense". [Id. at 34.] Third, the District Court found that the ICCPR was not "self executing" and that a private right of action should not be implied. Finally, the District Court found that the Universal Declaration of Human Rights does not impose obligations as a matter of international law. Instead, it is "merely aspirational". None of the sources of international law cited by the Plaintiffs were a proper predicate for jurisdiction under the Alien Tort Claims Act.

For the reasons discussed, the court granted Pfizer's motion to dismiss, for failure to state a claim under the Alien Tort Claims Act and, even if subject matter jurisdiction were found, the action would be dismissed on forum non conveniens grounds (under the same conditions set forth in Abdullahi I).

== Ajudu Ismaila Adamu v. Pfizer, Inc. ==
The District Court recites the facts set forth in Abdullahi I, and the analysis of the Alien Tort Claims Act set forth in Abdullahi III, before turning to the claims under the Connecticut Unfair Trade Practices Act and the Connecticut Products Liability Statute. The court began by analyzing Connecticut's choice of law principles. Under Connecticut's qualified lex loci delicti doctrine, the District Court concluded that Nigerian — not Connecticut — substantive law governs, and accordingly, both Connecticut law claims were dismissed. In addition to lack of subject matter jurisdiction, under both the Alien Tort Claims Act and the Connecticut statutory causes of action, the court also granted the motion to dismiss on grounds of forum non conveniens, with the same additional conditions required by Abdullahi I and Abdullahi III.

== Nigerian government lawsuit ==
On 5 June 2007, the government of Nigeria filed against Pfizer in the Nigerian Federal High Court, seeking US$6.95 billion in damages. Nigeria claimed that Pfizer "never obtained approval of the relevant regulatory agencies... nor did the defendant seek or receive approval to conduct any clinical trial at any time before their illegal conduct". After preliminary arguments, the case was adjourned until 26 June of that year.

=== 2009 settlement ===
In February 2009, Pfizer decided to settle its legal case with the 200 plaintiffs. An out-of-court settlement was reached, and scheduled to be put in writing at a meeting in Rome, Italy in March 2009. The settlement followed months of negotiations between Pfizer and the Kano state government which represented the plaintiffs. According to Wikileaked US embassy cables, Pfizer's country manager admitted that "Pfizer had hired investigators to uncover corruption links to federal attorney general Michael Aondoakaa to expose him and put pressure on him to drop the federal cases".

The talks were brokered by the former Nigerian military leader Yakubu Gowon and the former U.S. President Jimmy Carter. The lawyer representing the Nigerian government was Babatunde Irukera.

In October 2009, the medical records of the victims of the 1996 Pfizer Trovan clinical trial could not be found at the Kano State Ministry of Health nor at the Infectious Diseases Hospital (IDH) where the trials were conducted, according to the state's Attorney General and Commissioner for Justice Barrister Aliyu Umar, shortly after Umar confirmed that the state government had received $10 million from Pfizer as part of the $75 million settlement of the protracted dispute. The Nigerian government conducted their own investigation, whose report was kept secret for five years with the only three printed copies being lost.

== See also ==
- Medical experimentation in Africa
- The Constant Gardener, a book (and film) inspired by the scandal
- Teva Canada Ltd. v. Pfizer Canada Inc.
