= Maurice Henry Pappworth =

British medical ethicist and tutor (1910–1994)

- Born: 9 January 1910
- Died: 12 October 1994 (aged 84)
- Medical career
- Notable works: Human Guinea Pigs

Maurice Henry Pappworth (9 January 1910 – 12 October 1994) was a British medical ethicist and tutor, best known for his 1967 book Human Guinea Pigs, which exposed unethical dimensions of medical research.

Born and educated in Liverpool, Pappworth graduated as a Bachelor of Medicine, Bachelor of Surgery in 1932 from Liverpool University. After working in a series of junior medical positions, his applications for more senior posts were rejected. During the Second World War he served in the Royal Army Medical Corps. Having been unsuccessful in achieving a post in any well known London hospital after the war, he set up in London as an independent medical consultant and tutor.

Pappworth's teaching of postgraduate students had a profound effect on the Membership of the Royal College of Physicians (MRCP) examination pass rate, and his contact with junior doctors led him to investigate the ethics of medical research on humans. The publication of Human Guinea Pigs, which examined unethical medical research practices, exposed the subject to a wider audience and led to Pappworth's becoming persona non grata within the medical establishment for much of his career, but ultimately helped lead to stricter codes of practice for human experimentation.

== Early life and education ==
Maurice Henry Papperovitch was born on 9 January 1910, (Note: To parents (Isaac) Jacob Papperovitch (d. 1960), who changed the family name in the 1930s, and (Miriam) Mary (d. 1935).) Pappworth was the seventh child in a family that included three sons and six daughters. He graduated MB ChB (Hons) (Bachelor of Medicine and Bachelor of Surgery with honours) from Liverpool University's medical school in 1932 after previously studying at the Birkenhead Institute. In 1936, he received his MD degree (medical doctorate) and passed the MRCP exam (Membership of the Royal College of Physicians), after which he worked in several Liverpool hospitals in junior roles—including as a registrar under Henry Cohen. Before the Second World War, Pappworth sought an (unpaid) medical consultant role only to suffer from anti-Semitic discrimination, being told that "no Jew could ever be a gentleman" when he applied for a post in 1939. That position eventually went to a student whom he had coached for the MRCP exam. From 1941 to 1946, he served in the Royal Army Medical Corps, rising to the rank of lieutenant colonel and serving in Africa, Italy, Greece and finally India, where he ran a British general hospital. In 1946, Pappworth moved to London, where his applications for consultant posts in university teaching hospitals were rejected. He turned down several lesser posts before setting up as an independent consultant. In 1953, he married Jean Goldberg; the couple went on to have three daughters.

== Postgraduate teaching ==
In the 1950s, the pass rate for the MRCP examination seldom topped fifteen percent, partly due to the medical establishment's need to restrict the number of applicants to senior positions, but also—Pappworth maintained—because of low teaching standards in medical schools. Almost no preparation for the MRCP exam was given to postgraduates, so Pappworth resolved to tutor qualified doctors in the particulars of medicine and patient examination that the exam required. Charging one pound—then not inconsiderable—for a two-hour class, Pappworth began teaching in his consulting rooms, later moving the classes to a public hall in London. He also staged mock examinations in nearby mental hospitals for a higher cost. The pass rate for Pappworth's students was "outstandingly good"; sometimes more than half of those who passed the exam had been taught by him. Over the course of his career, Pappworth tutored more than 1,600 doctors, many of whom were from overseas. He claimed that 75 percent of the successful New Zealand and Australian candidates could trace their success to his teaching. Many working consultants in the United Kingdom admit Pappworth's influence on the success of their careers. While recognized as the best medical teacher in the country, Pappworth was unafraid of speaking his mind about the medical establishment; equally, the Royal College of Physicians did not withhold criticism of Pappworth's unwanted encroachment into its affairs. In 1960, Pappworth's lectures were published as A Primer of Medicine. It ran to three editions, but lacked the comprehensive and incisive nature of his spoken lectures.

He is credited with coining the term "diagnostic greed"; "overwhelming evidence is not essential for correct diagnosis, and the absence of some expected symptom or sign often does not invalidate an otherwise reasonable diagnosis".

One of his most influential pupils was the oncologist Martin Gore, who also wrote a foreword in the biography written by Pappworth's daughter.

== Human Guinea Pigs ==
In the 1950s and 1960s, Pappworth became concerned by descriptions in medical journals of unethical experiments on human subjects in the United Kingdom and United States; his growing awareness of the issue was reinforced by the concerns of his postgraduate students, who sometimes had no choice but to facilitate and participate in such experiments or face career ruin. The experiments went against the principles set out in the Nuremberg Code, so Pappworth began writing letters to medical journals that had presented the research. Many of these went unprinted, so in 1962 he published fourteen of the letters as Human Guinea Pigs: A Warning in a special edition of Twentieth Century magazine.

Pappworth made plans to publish an extended version of his article as a book. Human Guinea Pigs: Experimentation on Man named those responsible for the research and fully cited its sources. It detailed experiments on children and inmates of mental and penal institutions, and included 78 examples of research that had been carried out on patients who were at National Health Service hospitals for routine surgery. Some of these patients had been subjected to cardiac catheterisation—the insertion of a catheter into a chamber or vessel of the heart—without informed consent. Pappworth believed the reasons for the experiments to be purely for the career advancement of those involved. Pappworth was advised by the medical establishment to keep quiet on the issue, but he refused. The six publishers he approached declined the book due concerns about libel, but Human Guinea Pigs was eventually published in 1967 by Routledge and Kegan Paul.

The book's publication provoked an immediate storm; newspaper and television coverage of the issue followed, as well as questions in Parliament. Pappworth's American contemporary Henry K. Beecher, with whom Pappworth had corresponded before and after Human Guinea Pigs' publication, had published similar findings in the New England Journal of Medicine in 1966, but had not named those involved. Despite official lack of interest and professional impedance, Pappworth's and Beecher's work eventually led to the introduction of stricter codes of practice for human experimentation and the establishment of research ethics committees, which would have come much later had it not been for their exposés.

In an article published by King's Fund Alex Bayliss argues that this book had a huge impact on research ethics, he argues it was so powerful as Pappworth named names in the book and cited the papers in which unethical experiments were described.

== Later career and personal life ==
It has been suggested that the unintended consequence of this exposure was Pappworth's becoming persona non-grata within the medical establishment. His critical nature may have been partly to blame for this, as he not only continued to admonish Royal College of Physicians, but also alienated some of those in the medical establishment that were sympathetic to his cause; Pappworth's personal comments about specific consultants quickly distanced his audience when he was invited to speak to the residents at Hammersmith Hospital, whose medical school he had criticised in Human Guinea Pigs for its unethical methods. Pappworth's attitude towards students could also leave them feeling "ignorant, foolish, and humiliated".

Towards the end of his life, he wrote an article in the British Medical Journal that included his view that "those who dirty the linen and not those who wash it should be criticised. Some do not wash linen in public or in private and the dirt is merely left to accumulate until it stinks". Pappworth continued to be disregarded by the medical establishment. For example, election to a fellowship of the Royal College of Physicians is usually a formality awarded after passing the MRCP—which Pappworth did in 1936—and after being in practice for ten to fifteen years. He was not awarded a fellowship until 1993, when changes in the corridors of power made this possible.

Pappworth's interests outside medicine included photography, fine art and watercolours, philosophy, religion, and politics. He died on 12 October 1994 of coronary heart disease at his London home; he was survived by his wife and three daughters.

His daughter Dr. Joanna Seldon published her book The Whistle Blower: The Life of Maurice Pappworth: the Story of One Man's Battle Against the Medical Establishment in 2017.

== Selected publications ==
- A Primer of Medicine. Eliciting and assessing clinical signs, and the art and science of diagnosis. London: Butterworths. 1st ed. 1960; 2nd ed. 1963; 3rd ed. 1971 ISBN 0 407 62602 6; 4th ed. 1978 ISBN 0 407 62603 4
- Human Guinea Pigs. Experimentation on man. London: Beacon Press 1968. ISBN 978 0 80702191 0
  - Published in Italian as Cavie Humane and German as Menschen als Versuchskaninchen
- Passing Medical Examinations. A guide to undergraduates, postgraduates and examiners. London: Butterworths 1975. ISBN 0 407 00013 5
