= Gustav Alexander =

Gustav Alexander (1873 – 12 April 1932) was an Austrian otolaryngologist remembered for describing Alexander's law. He was the director of the Department of Otology of the Wiener Allgemeine Poliklinik from 1917 until his death. He was the father of Leo Alexander.

He was assassinated on the street between his home and the Poliklinik by Johann Soukop, a Czechoslovak former patient who had tried to assassinate him 22 years earlier.
