= Teva Canada Ltd v Pfizer Canada Inc =

- Supreme Court of Canada

Hearing: April 18, 2012 Judgment: November 8, 2012
- Full case name: Teva Canada Limited v Pfizer Canada Inc., Pfizer Inc., Pfizer Ireland Pharmaceuticals, Pfizer Research and Development Company N.V./S.A. and Minister of Health
- Citations: 2012 SCC 60
- Docket No.: 33951
- Prior history: APPEAL from Novopharm Limited v. Pfizer Canada Inc., 2010 FCA 242 (23 September 2010), affirming Pfizer Canada Inc. v. Novopharm Limited, 2009 FC 638 (18 June 2009).
- Ruling: Appeal allowed

Holding
- The disclosure requirement in Patent Act is evaluated with respect to each invention in the patent, and not necessarily with each individual patent claim.

Court membership
- Chief Justice: Beverley McLachlin; Puisne Justices: Louis LeBel, Marie Deschamps, Morris Fish, Rosalie Abella, Marshall Rothstein, Thomas Cromwell, Michael Moldaver, Andromache Karakatsanis

Reasons given
- Unanimous reasons by: LeBel J.
- Fish and Karakatsanis JJ. took no part in the consideration or decision of the case.

Teva Canada Ltd v Pfizer Canada Inc, 2012 SCC 60 is a leading Supreme Court of Canada decision on the disclosure requirements for a patent in Canada.

== Background ==
While testing the compound sildenafil on patients suffering from angina, Pfizer observed that some patients experienced spontaneous erections. Consequently, Pfizer carried out a clinical study to test the effects of sildenafil on patients with erectile dysfunction (ED). The study showed that sildenafil was effective at treating ED. Pfizer then proceeded to obtain Patent 2,163,446 for the use of a range of compounds for the treatment of erectile dysfunction, even though sildenafil was the only compound in the patent that had been shown to be effective in doing so.

The patent contained a number of claims:

- Claim 1 sets out a formula that covers 260 quintillion compounds.
- Claims 2 to 5 are for successively smaller ranges of compounds of the formula, with claim 5 being narrowed down to a range of nine compounds.
- Claims 6 and 7 relate to a single compound each, of which Claim 7 relates to sildenafil.
- However, the patent application did not disclose that the compound that works is found in Claim 7, or that the remaining compounds in the patent had not been found to be effective in treating ED. The patent disclosure states that there are "especially preferred" compounds and lists nine of those compounds. Included in the list of nine is sildenafil. The patent adds that "patient studies conducted thus far have confirmed that one of the especially preferred compounds induces penile erection in impotent males".

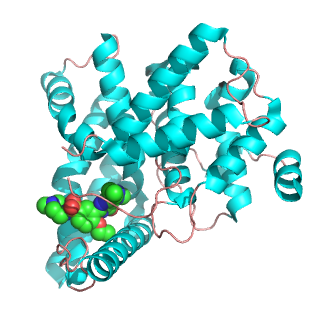
Crystal structure of human PDE5 with bound sildenafil. PDB entry 1udt

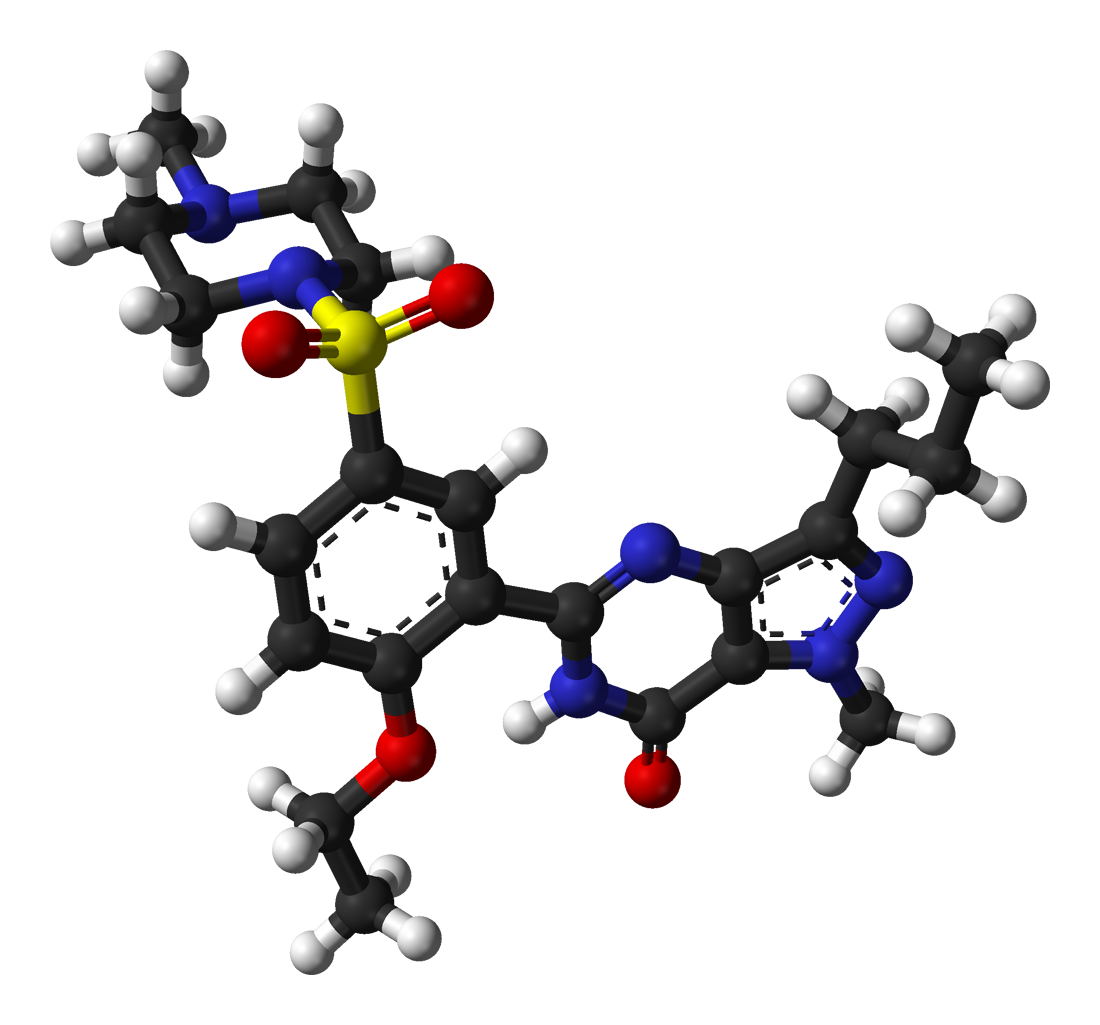
Ball-and-stick model of the sildenafil molecule, based on the crystal structure of sildenafil citrate monohydrate.

Novopharm (later renamed Teva Canada), a generic drug manufacturer, filed an Abbreviated New Drug Submission with Health Canada in December 2006 to allow for the manufacture of a generic version of sildenafil.

Pfizer applied to the Federal Court for an order under the Patented Medicines (Notice of Compliance) Regulations, prohibiting the Minister of Health from issuing a Notice of Compliance to Novopharm for a generic version of Viagra until the Pfizer patent expired in 2014. In its defence, Novopharm alleged that the patent was invalid for obviousness, lack of utility, and insufficiency of disclosure so that the generic version of Viagra should immediately be allowed on the Canadian market.

=== Patent specification in Canadian law ===
The disclosure requirements for a patent are set out in section 27(3) of the Patent Act:

(3) The specification of an invention must

(a) correctly and fully describe the invention and its operation or use as contemplated by the inventor;
(b) set out clearly the various steps in a process, or the method of constructing, making, compounding or using a machine, manufacture or composition of matter, in such full, clear, concise and exact terms as to enable any person skilled in the art or science to which it pertains, or with which it is most closely connected, to make, construct, compound or use it;
(c) in the case of a machine, explain the principle of the machine and the best mode in which the inventor has contemplated the application of that principle; and
(d) in the case of a process, explain the necessary sequence, if any, of the various steps, so as to distinguish the invention from other inventions.

== The courts below ==
Kelen J released his decision in June 2009, finding in favour of Pfizer. In his decision, he drew upon current Canadian patent jurisprudence:

... the patent must answer only two questions to meet the sufficiency requirement for the purpose of subsection 27(3):

1. What is the invention?; and
2. How does it work?

However, he expressed his discomfort about the contemporary practice of drafting patent claims:

[148] While I found in obiter the construction and language in the patent obfuscated the reader and did not simply and distinctly describe the true invention for the skilled reader, I followed the jurisprudence that Claim 7 is a separate monopoly, and that Claim 7 alone with the disclosure can be read by the Court to determine whether the patent sufficiently described the invention and how it works. If I am wrong in reading or following this jurisprudence, I welcome judicial correction on appeal.

Novopharm appealed to the Federal Court of Appeal, which ruled in favour of Pfizer in a unanimous decision by Nadon JA in September 2010, declaring, "... the Judge did not err. The invention herein is found in the compound disclosed in Claim 7, not in the patent as a whole." In doing so, he relied on the Court of Appeal's ruling in a previous case:

Nowhere does Justice Hughes state that those cases stand for the broad proposition that each claim in a patent represents a separate invention. Rather, his holding is much narrower; namely, in cases as in the present, where a single patent application separately claims a class of chemical compounds and a single compound within that class, each separate claim discloses a separate invention.

Teva appealed the ruling to the Supreme Court of Canada, for which leave to appeal was granted in May 2011.

== At the Supreme Court of Canada ==
In a unanimous decision written by LeBel J, the appeal was allowed. The Supreme Court rejected the view that each claim in a patent is necessarily a separate invention, and concluded that a patent specification must be read as a whole when identifying the invention in the patent and determining whether the patent satisfies the disclosure requirement. In its original judgment, the Court declared that Pfizer's patent for sildenafil was void, but the Court later changed its decision to say that Teva had established its allegation that the patent was invalid.

=== Ruling ===
In determining whether the disclosure requirements have been met, the first step is to define the nature of the invention in the patent. This must be done in order to comply with section 27(3), which requires that the specification 'correctly and fully describe the invention'.

Lebel J rejected the lower courts' treatment of each claim in a patent as a separate invention. Rather than treating each claim as a separate invention, the specification must be read as a whole to determine the invention. He concluded that if Pfizer's patent is viewed as a whole, there is only one invention: the use of the compounds that are effective at treating ED. He summarized it thus:

[80] I would not make too much of the fact that Claim 1 included over 260 quintillion compounds. The practice of cascading claims — although it may, as in this case, result in claims that are overly broad — is a common one that does not necessarily interfere in every case with the public’s right to disclosure. The skilled reader knows that, when a patent contains cascading claims, the useful claim will usually be the one at the end concerning an individual compound. The compounds that do not work are simply deemed invalid. In accordance with s. 58, any valid claim — in this case, Claim 7 — survives despite the existence of invalid claims. However, the public’s right to proper disclosure was denied in this case, since the claims ended with two individually claimed compounds, thereby obscuring the true invention. The disclosure failed to state in clear terms what the invention was. Pfizer gained a benefit from the Act — exclusive monopoly rights — while withholding disclosure in spite of its disclosure obligations under the Act. As a matter of policy and sound statutory interpretation, patentees cannot be allowed to “game” the system in this way. This, in my view, is the key issue in this appeal. It must be resolved against Pfizer.

=== Re-hearing and variation ===
On November 9, 2012 (the day after the Court released its judgment), Pfizer filed a motion for the Court to re-hear the appeal. In their application, Pfizer alleged that the court accidentally went beyond its jurisdiction by wholly voiding the Viagra patent.

On June 4, 2013, Pfizer's motion was allowed in part, with the Court varying its reasons and its order. Whereas the Court originally had declared the patent “void”, the Court now revised its holding to say that Teva established its allegation, under the statutory provisions in question, that the patent is not valid. Consequently, there was no longer a judicial declaration of voidness but merely an order that Pfizer's application for a "notice of prohibition" against Teva's version of sildenafil (under subsection 55.2(4) of the Patent Act) is dismissed.

Meanwhile, another generic manufacturer brought a separate action to invalidate Pfizer's patent (under section 60 of the Patent Act). On November 20, 2012, the Federal Court held that it was bound by the Supreme Court's decision and declared Pfizer's patent "invalid and void". Subsequently, on January 22, 2014, the Federal Court of Appeal affirmed the Federal Court's decision.

== Consequences ==
Teva Canada launched Novo-Sildenafil, a generic version of Viagra, on the day the Supreme Court of Canada released its decision.

On August 5, 2014, the Supreme Court of British Columbia certified a class action against Pfizer. The plaintiff, Britton Low, alleges that Pifzer wrongfully obtained the Viagra patent, which inflated the price of Viagra by delaying the introduction of competing generic versions.

== See also ==
- Sufficiency of disclosure in Canadian patent law
- List of Supreme Court of Canada cases (McLachlin Court)
- Abdullahi v. Pfizer, Inc.
