= Diagnostic overshadowing in autism =

Misattribution of medical symptoms to autism

Diagnostic overshadowing refers to the misattribution of new or co-occurring symptoms to an existing diagnosis like autism leading to under-diagnosis, delayed care or misdiagnosis of physical or mental health conditions. This phenomenon affects autistic people across age groups and support levels, contributing to significant health disparities. It occurs in many forms—including misinterpreting signs of pain in high-support individuals as autism-related behavior, dismissing mental health symptoms as part of autism, or overlooking aging-related health needs; and is reinforced by clinician bias, inadequate diagnostic tools, and fragmented care systems.

== Physical health ==
Autistic individuals experience elevated rates of a wide range of chronic physical conditions, including but not limited to gastrointestinal, neurological, and autoimmune disorders. Yet symptoms of these conditions are often misattributed to autism rather than investigated as distinct medical concerns. Communication differences, behavioral expressions of distress, and clinician assumptions contribute to this diagnostic overshadowing, increasing the risk that treatable conditions go unrecognized or untreated.

For example:

- Gastrointestinal symptoms such as abdominal pain, constipation, or diarrhea are prevalent in autism but are often interpreted as behavioral problems rather than indicators of an underlying medical issue.
- Atypical epileptic presentations, including absence or focal impaired awareness seizures, may be mistaken for "zoning out" or attention difficulties and thus go undiagnosed.
- Sleep disturbances, which are highly prevalent in autism, may be presumed to be behavioral and therefore not fully assessed or treated.
- Autoimmune conditions, such as autoimmune thyroid disease, type 1 diabetes, and celiac disease, are reported at higher rates in autistic individuals, yet are often overlooked due to nonspecific symptoms and limited screening access.
- The lack of adapted care pathways and poor clinician understanding of non-spoken distress contribute to systemic neglect.

Such misattributions can result in untreated or mistreated health conditions, leading to chronic discomfort, behavioral escalation, reduced inclusion, and poorer quality of life.

While these health challenges are especially visible in high-support populations, physical health disparities affect autistic individuals across the spectrum. A large population-based study of over 1,500 autistic adults found that nearly all medical conditions were significantly more common in autistic individuals compared to non-autistic controls, including immune conditions, gastrointestinal and sleep disorders, seizures, obesity, dyslipidemia, hypertension, and diabetes. Even rarer conditions, such as stroke and Parkinson's disease, were reported at elevated rates.

== Mental health ==
Autistic individuals are at significantly elevated risk for co-occurring psychiatric conditions such as anxiety, depression, and obsessive-compulsive disorder (OCD). However, these symptoms are often misinterpreted as core features of autism, a misattribution that leads to diagnostic overshadowing and hinders access to appropriate mental health care.

This issue affects individuals across the support spectrum. In both speaking and minimally speaking autistic people, internalizing symptoms; such as sadness, anxiety, or suicidality, may be under recognized or dismissed. For higher-support individuals, clinicians may assume that the person lacks the cognitive or emotional capacity to experience complex mental states like depression or trauma-related distress; or the dominant focus on overt behavioral issues may result in overlooking their mental health issues.

For autistic adults, the problem is compounded by systemic barriers to care. A meta-synthesis of qualitative studies found that many autistic adults described mental health services as inaccessible, invalidating, or lacking clinicians who understood autism-specific presentations of emotional distress. Participants reported being misdiagnosed or not taken seriously, with their concerns frequently dismissed as "just part of autism." These findings underscore how diagnostic overshadowing in the mental health domain leads to widespread unmet needs and avoidable psychological suffering in the autistic population.

== Diagnostic overshadowing in reverse ==
In some cases, diagnostic overshadowing occurs in reverse: autism itself is not recognized because prior diagnoses (e.g., ADHD, anxiety disorders, personality disorders) are seen as sufficient explanations. This is common in:

- Autistic women and people of color, who are more likely to receive alternative diagnoses or be viewed through gendered/racial stereotypes.
- Late-diagnosed adults, who often report a long history of misdiagnoses before receiving an accurate autism diagnosis.

Delayed or missed autism diagnoses, particularly due to diagnostic overshadowing, can impede access to identity-affirming communities, self-understanding, and support systems, especially for adults who have masked symptoms for years.

== Systemic contributors ==
Beyond individual clinical judgments, diagnostic overshadowing in autism is perpetuated by broader systemic issues in healthcare, education, and social services. These systemic contributors often reinforce and amplify the likelihood of misattributing symptoms, especially in multiply marginalized groups.

=== Clinician bias and limited training ===
Many clinicians receive minimal training in recognizing co-occurring conditions in autistic individuals, particularly when presentations deviate from textbook examples or involve autistics with greater communication challenges. Studies show that even experienced physicians report limited confidence in treating autistic adults, and may underestimate their pain sensitivity, emotional range, or cognitive awareness.

=== Fragmented and siloed healthcare systems ===
Diagnostic overshadowing is exacerbated when healthcare is compartmentalized. Developmental disabilities, psychiatric care, and physical medicine are often treated by different specialists with limited interdisciplinary communication. This siloed care increases the risk that providers will fail to recognize symptoms that fall outside their domain, defaulting instead to autism as a 'catch-all' explanation.

=== Masking and camouflaging ===
Many autistic individuals engage in adaptive behaviors to fit into social environments and meet neurotypical expectations. This set of strategies is commonly referred to as masking and camouflaging. Masking typically involves suppressing outward signs of autism—such as stimming, meltdowns, or atypical facial expressions—while camouflaging more broadly includes efforts to mimic neurotypical communication and social behavior, such as rehearsing conversations, forcing eye contact, or copying others' tone or gestures. Although initially studied in autistic women, both masking and camouflaging are now recognized as common across genders, age groups, and support levels.

These strategies may help individuals avoid stigma or social exclusion, but they can also have unintended clinical consequences. By obscuring visible signs of disability or distress, masking and camouflaging can lead clinicians to misinterpret an individual's needs—masking co-occurring mental health conditions and delaying autism diagnoses . This contributes directly to diagnostic overshadowing, as a seemingly "appropriate" social presentation may be mistakenly taken as evidence of well-being, causing underlying challenges to be missed. Over time, this mismatch between external presentation and internal experience can also contribute to chronic stress, and autistic burnout.

=== Intersectionality: race, gender, and class ===
Autistic individuals who are also members of marginalized groups face additional barriers. Cultural differences in symptom expression and systemic biases in healthcare contribute to under-diagnoses, mis-diagnoses, and unequal access to evaluation and care. For instance, black autistic children are more likely to be labeled with conduct disorder or behavioral disorders instead of autism.

=== Over-reliance on standardized tools ===
Many commonly used diagnostic instruments are not validated for use with autistic individuals who have intellectual disability, use non-spoken communication, or autistics who show non-normative presentations. As a result, tools may fail to detect symptoms like anxiety or PTSD, particularly in those with higher support needs, increasing reliance on clinician intuition (often biased or under-informed; and reinforcing diagnostic overshadowing.

== Diagnostic overshadowing over the lifespan ==
Although diagnostic overshadowing is often studied in children and younger adults, it also significantly affects autistic individuals as they age. Many health conditions commonly associated with aging, such as cardiovascular disease, arthritis, sensory loss, and cognitive decline—may go unrecognized or be misattributed to autism, particularly in those with long-standing communication barriers or support needs.

Autistic older adults face increased risk for both physical and mental health conditions, yet often encounter barriers to screening and diagnosis due to systemic neglect and attribution errors. A population-based study of Medicare-enrolled autistic adults over age 65 found higher prevalence rates of chronic illnesses such as hypertension, diabetes, depression, and dementia, compared to their non-autistic peers. Despite these elevated risks, many symptoms are overlooked, with clinicians attributing them to an individual's existing autism diagnosis rather than investigating new or unrelated health concerns.

This form of lifespan overshadowing reflects both a lack of geriatric care pathways for autistic people and insufficient provider training on how aging interacts with neurodevelopmental disability.

Several factors may contribute to diagnostic overshadowing in older autistic populations. These include limited access to primary care screening for common age-related conditions, communication barriers that complicate symptom reporting, and diagnostic histories marked by delayed or missed autism diagnoses. Additionally, developmental disability services often do not include geriatric care planning, leaving aging-related health needs unmet once individuals "age out" of youth-oriented systems.

As a result, older autistic adults (especially, higher-support autistics), may be at heightened risk for misattributed cognitive decline (e.g., assuming communication challenges reflect autism when it may signal aging related dementia or memory loss), untreated sensory loss (e.g., assuming withdrawal is "behavioral" instead of due to hearing loss), inadequate pain management; all of which significantly reduce quality of life.
