= Leo Alexander =

Austrian-American psychiatrist and neurologist (1905–1985)

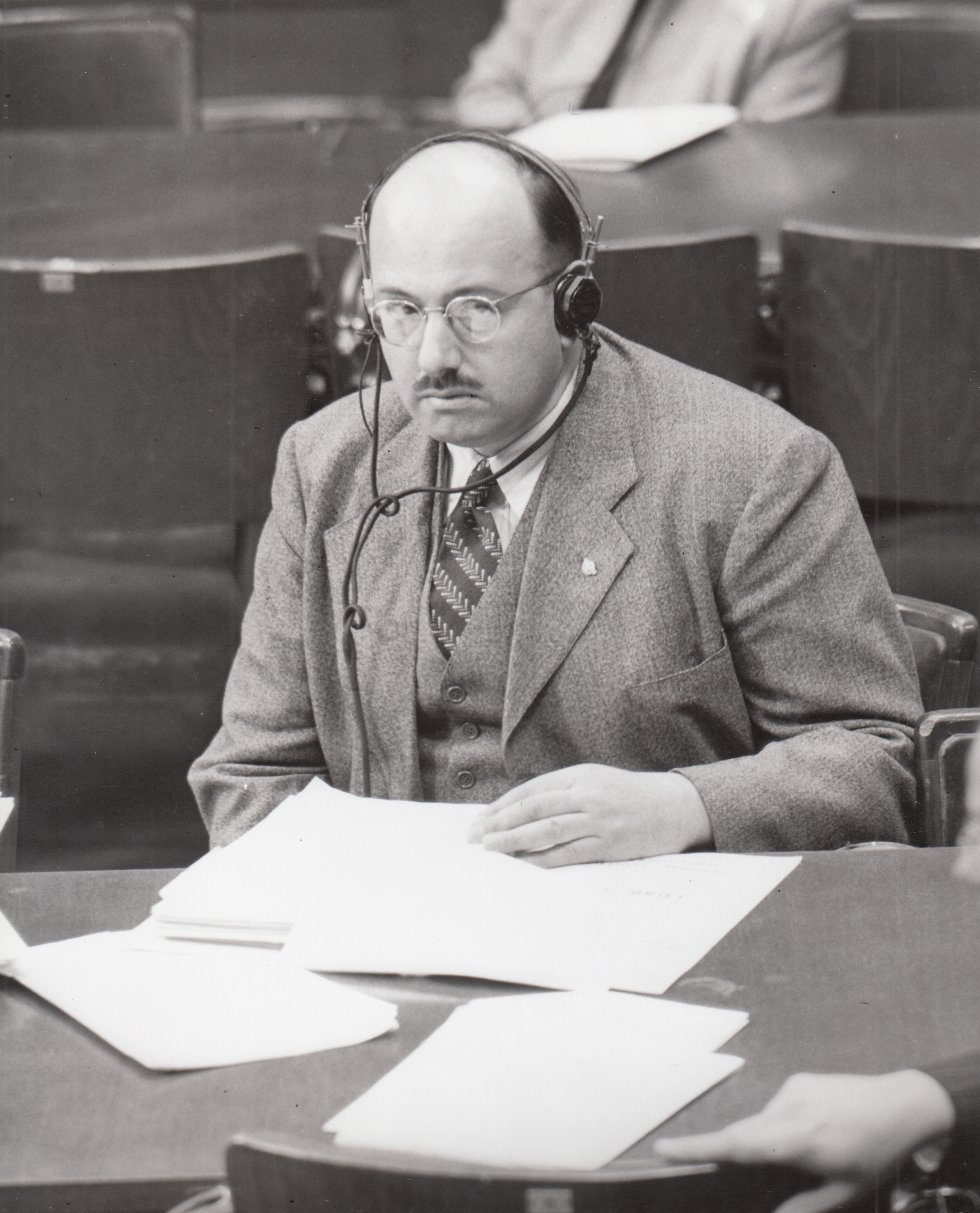
- Born: October 11, 1905; Vienna, Austria-Hungary
- Died: July 20, 1985 (aged 79); Weston, Massachusetts
- Education: University of Vienna Medical School, Goethe University Frankfurt
- Known for: participation in the Nuremberg trials
- Scientific career
- Fields: Neurology, psychiatry
- Workplaces: Peking Union Medical College, Harvard University, Duke University, Tufts Medical School, Boston State Hospital

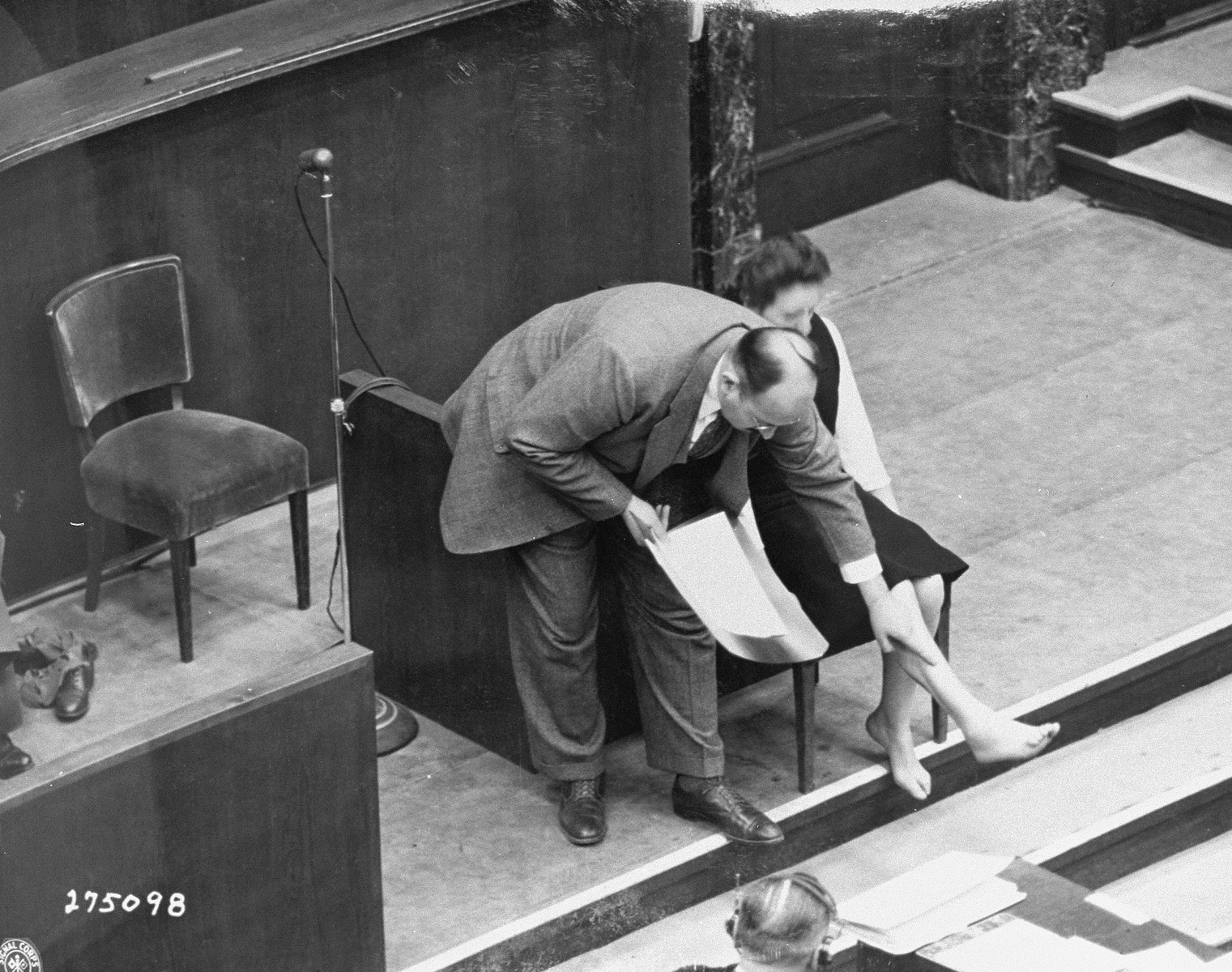
Leo Alexander describes Nazi human experimentation during the Doctors' Trial

Leo Alexander (October 11, 1905 – July 20, 1985) was an American psychiatrist, neurologist, educator, and author, of Austrian-Jewish origin. He was a key medical advisor during the Nuremberg trials. Alexander wrote part of the Nuremberg Code, which provides legal and ethical principles for human experimentation.

== Life ==
Born in Vienna, Austria-Hungary, Alexander was the son of a physician. His father, Gustav Alexander, was an ear, nose and throat doctor in Vienna, who had published more than eighty scientific papers even before Leo was born. His mother, Gisela Alexander, was the first woman awarded a PhD in philosophy from the University of Vienna.

He graduated from the University of Vienna Medical School in 1929 and interned in psychiatry at the University of Frankfurt. In January 1933, he went to Peking Union Medical College in China for half a year as an honorary lecturer in neurology and psychiatry. After Adolf Hitler had taken power, Alexander could not return to Germany, and was awarded a fellowship at a state mental hospital in Worcester, Massachusetts.

He taught at the medical schools of Harvard University and Duke University. During the war, he worked in Europe under United States Secretary of War Robert P. Patterson as an army medical investigator with the rank of Major. After the war, he was appointed chief medical advisor to Telford Taylor, the U.S. Chief of Counsel for War Crimes, and participated in the Nuremberg trials in November 1946. He conceived the principles of the Nuremberg Code after observing and documenting German SS medical experiments at Dachau, and instances of sterilization and euthanasia. Alexander later wrote that "science under dictatorship becomes subordinated to the guiding philosophy of the dictatorship."

Later, he served as assistant clinical professor of psychiatry at Tufts University Medical School, where he stayed for almost 30 years. As a consultant for the Boston Police Department, Alexander was instrumental in solving the Boston Strangler case. He directed the Multiple Sclerosis Center at Boston State Hospital, where he researched multiple sclerosis and studied neuropathology. He arranged for the treatment of 40 German Nazi concentration camp victims who had been injected by Josef Mengele with a precursor to gas gangrene, and provided them with psychiatric therapy. Alexander wrote several books on psychiatry and neuropathology, and coined the terms thanatology—defined as the study of death—and ktenology—the science of killing.

Alexander was a leading proponent of electroconvulsive (shock) therapy and insulin shock therapy. According to psychiatrist Peter Breggin, Alexander – who was German-trained and German-speaking – was also an early eugenicist, and the failure of the Doctors' trial to bring psychiatrists to justice was due in part to Alexander being the chief investigator.

Alexander died of cancer on 20 July 1985 in Weston, Massachusetts, survived by three children.
