= Aminu Kano Teaching Hospital =

Healthcare organization in Kano, Nigeria

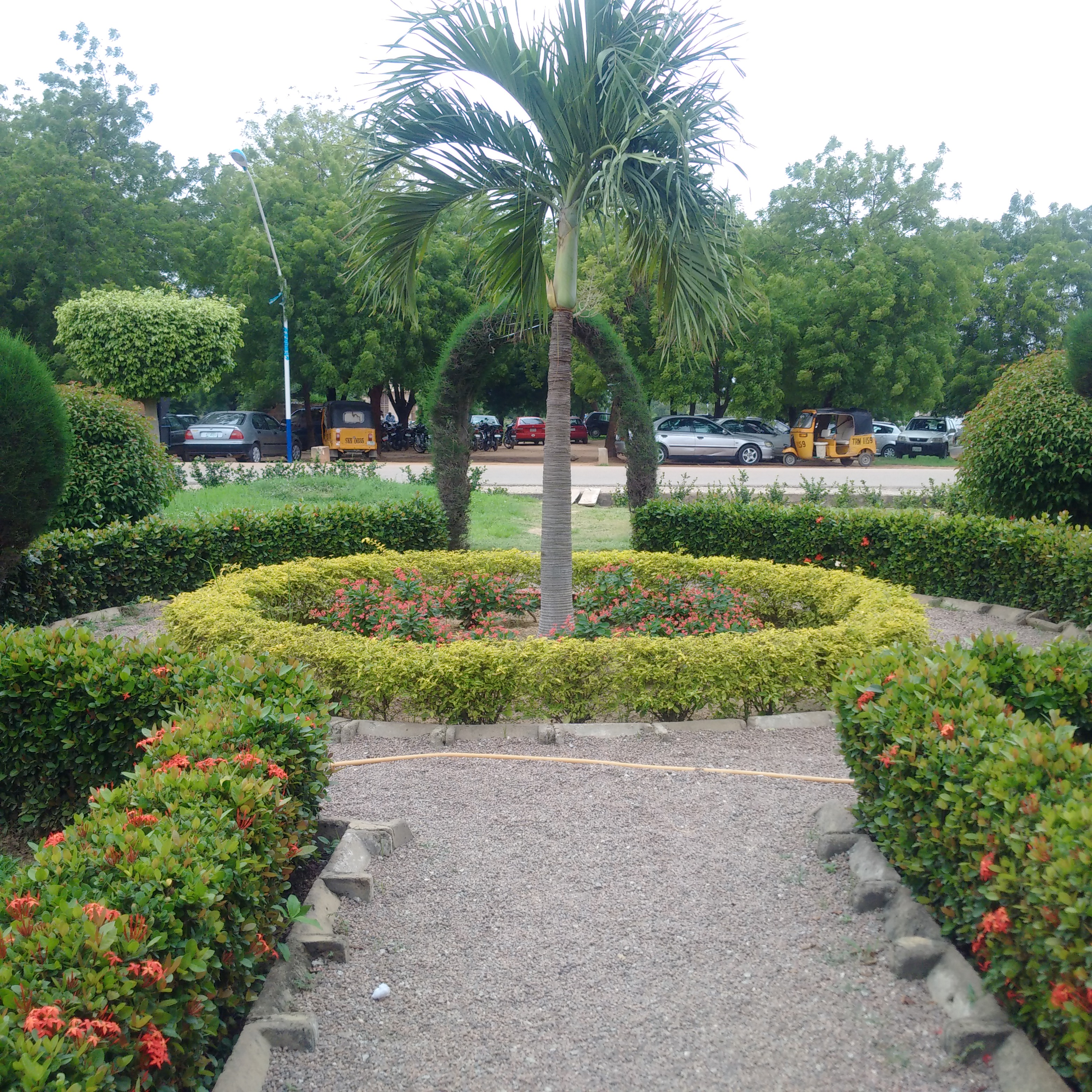
- A park in Aminu Kano Teaching Hospital

Geography
- Location: Kano, North west, Kano, Nigeria
- Coordinates: 11.9626°N 8.5519°E

Organisation
- Type: Teaching

Services
- Emergency department: Yes

Links
- Website: akth.gov.ng
- Lists: Hospitals in Nigeria

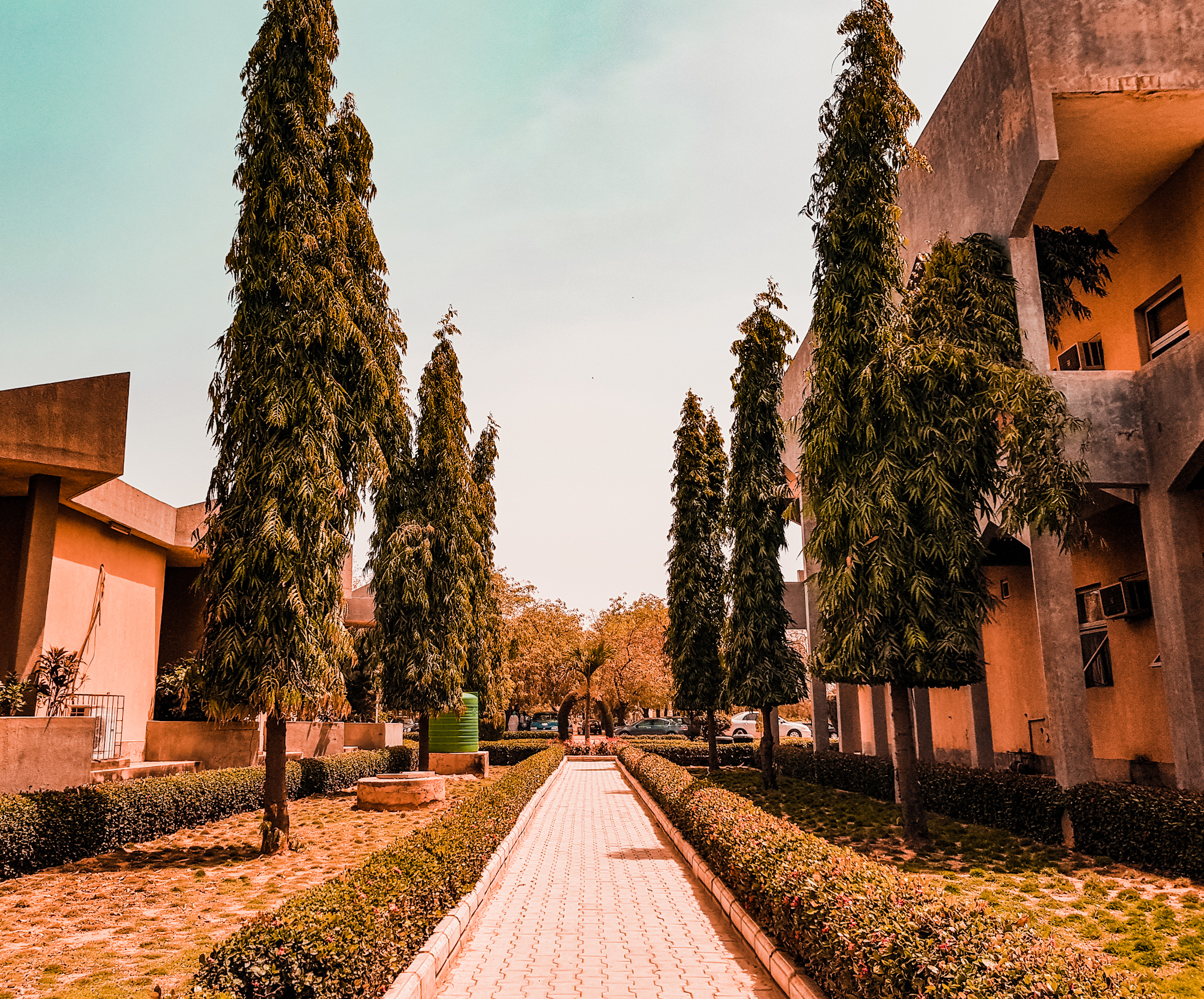
Aminu Kano Teaching Hospital

Aminu Kano Teaching Hospital is a Federal Government Teaching Hospital located in Kano State, Nigeria. It was formerly known as Bayero University Teaching hospital. The current chief medical director is Abdurrahman Abba Sheshe.

Aminu Kano Teaching Hospital serves three main functions: training of medical students and Resident doctors, provision of specialist medical services to the sick, and important research for the advancement of medical knowledge.

The hospital is effective in training of Bayero University medical students and postgraduate medical doctors (residency training). It recorded success over the years, including being the first government hospital to perform a successful kidney transplant in the year 2002, and the former Chief Medical Director Professor Abdulhamid Isa Dutse was instrumental in the transplant.

== Departments ==
Aminu Kano Teaching Hospital has sixteen clinical departments: Internal Medicine, Paediatrics, Obstetrics and Gynaecology, Surgery, Ophthalmology, ENT, Dental and Maxillofacial surgery, Radiology, Histopathology, Chemical Pathology, Haematology and blood transfusion, and Medical microbiology.

== Leadership ==
AKTH has been managed by various distinguished medical professionals.

- Prof. Sadiq Suleiman Wali – a specialist in gastroenterology and the hospital’s first Chief Medical Director.
- Prof. Abdulhamid Isa Dutse– a clinical hematologist and oncologist, served as CMD from 2003 to 2011.
- Prof. Aminu Zakari Muhammed – a histopathologist, who also served as CMD.
- Prof. Abdurrahman Abba Sheshe – a surgeon and the current Chief Medical Director (appointed in 2019).

== Renovation ==
The Economy community of West Africa state (ECOWAS) renovated the rehabilitation center and drug treatment facility in the teaching hospital.

=== Commission ===
In August 2024, a geriatrics ward was commissioned in the hospital, which stands as the first in northern Nigeria.

=== Partnership ===
Aminu Kano teaching hospital and the Universitätsmedizin Greifswald (UMG), a hospital in Germany collaborated with National Blood Services Agency (NBSA) to enhance blood transfusion safety nationwide.
