= Alexander's law =

Refers to gaze-evoked nystagmus

Alexander's law refers to gaze-evoked nystagmus that occurs after an acute unilateral vestibular loss. It was first described in 1912 and has three elements to explain how the vestibulo-ocular reflex responds to an acute vestibular insult. The first element says that spontaneous nystagmus after an acute vestibular impairment has the fast phase directed toward the healthy ear. The direction of the nystagmus, by convention, is named for the fast phase, so the spontaneous nystagmus is directed toward the healthy ear. The second element says nystagmus is greatest when gaze is directed toward the healthy ear, is attenuated at central gaze and may be absent when gaze is directed toward the impaired ear. The third element says that spontaneous nystagmus with central gaze is augmented when vision is denied. This became apparent with the implementation of electrographic testing.

Alexander's law states that in individuals with nystagmus, the amplitude of the nystagmus increases when the eye moves in the direction of the fast phase (saccade). It is manifested during spontaneous nystagmus in a patient with a vestibular lesion. The nystagmus becomes more intense when the patient looks in the quick-phase than in the slow-phase direction.

The law was named after Gustav Alexander who described it in 1912.
