= Krebiozen =

Disproven cancer treatment

Krebiozen (aka Carcalon, creatine, substance X, or drug X) is a disproven alternative cancer treatment. While the substance has been marketed as a cure for cancer, originally sold for thousands of dollars per dose in the 1950s and early '60s, Krebiozen is not known to possess any therapeutic value. Attempts to analyze this patent medicine have shown that Krebiozen consists only of the amino acid creatine dissolved in mineral oil, and some samples sold as Krebiozen consist solely of mineral oil with no other discernible ingredients.

The American Cancer Society (ACS) states: "Available scientific evidence does not support claims that Krebiozen is effective in treating cancer or any other disease." ACS did not have data on safety but noted that "creatine supplements have been linked with some side effects."

== History and evaluation ==
Krebiozen was initially promoted by Stevan Durovic, a Yugoslavian physician who claimed that the substance was isolated from the blood serum of horses inoculated with Actinomyces bovis. Durovic claimed that Krebiozen had been useful in the treatment of cancer, mainly in cats and dogs. His claims were backed by Andrew Conway Ivy, a prominent physiologist, and by several politicians including Senator Paul Douglas (D-IL). Ivy became convinced that Krebiozen possessed anti-cancer properties, administered the substance to himself and colleagues, then to a dog, and eventually started testing Krebiozen on patients.

Ivy called a press conference in 1951 at which he announced to an audience of journalists, politicians, doctors and potential investors that Krebiozen was a success. At the press conference, Ivy claimed that of 22 treated patients, 14 were alive and none had died of cancer. However, in reality 10 of the treated patients had died—all of cancer—at the time of the press conference. Shortly afterward, the Krebiozen Research Foundation was established by the Durovic brothers, with Ivy as president.

Intrigued by Ivy's announcement, 10 hospitals and cancer research centers followed up on the trial and attempted to reproduce Ivy's claimed results. None of these independent researchers observed any effect of Krebiozen on cancer. A compilation of these institutions' negative data was reported in the Journal of the American Medical Association in 1951. Krebiozen's backers responded by alleging a conspiracy against the drug. In 1959, Ivy began producing his own version of the drug under the name "Carcalon".

On October 28, 1964, the Durovics, Ivy and the Krebiozen Research Foundation were indicted for introducing mislabeled drugs into interstate commerce in violation of the Food, Drug and Cosmetic Act. After a 9-month trial, the case ended with a hung jury and they were acquitted. Soon afterwards, Durovic was indicted for tax evasion and fled the United States.

== Composition ==
In order to evaluate Durovic's and Ivy's claims, the National Cancer Institute (NCI) requested samples of Krebiozen. These were provided on two occasions to the NCI and one occasion to the U.S. Food and Drug Administration (FDA). Durovic proposed to charge the NCI $170,000 per gram of Krebiozen, although ultimately the samples were provided free of charge. However, the FDA spectrophotometry team, led by Alma Levant Hayden, proved the samples consisted only of creatine (as the monohydrate), a simple and inexpensive amino acid, dissolved in white mineral oil. When the FDA went back to test previously acquired samples of Krebiozen, they found that many lacked even the creatine monohydrate, and consisted solely of white mineral oil.

== See also ==
- Homeopathy
- List of ineffective cancer treatments
