= The Hague Ethical Guidelines =

Ethical principles in the chemical sciences

The Hague Ethical Guidelines is a set of ethical principles regarding responsible conduct in the chemical sciences and to guard against the misuse of chemistry. The guidelines were developed by a group of chemical practitioners from around the world together with the Organisation for the Prohibition of Chemical Weapons, and are endorsed by the International Union of Pure and Applied Chemistry.
