= Diagnostic greed =

Medical term coined by physician Maurice Pappworth

Diagnostic greed is a medical term coined by physician Maurice Pappworth to describe the rigidity of physicians in insisting on every classic symptom and physical sign be present before making a diagnosis. Pappworth explained that “overwhelming evidence is not essential for correct diagnosis, and the absence of some expected symptom or sign often does not invalidate an otherwise reasonable diagnosis.”

Where a diagnosis may have considerable impact, additional tests providing supporting evidence might be required, making diagnostic greed advantageous.

== Origin and definition ==
Overwhelming evidence is not essential for correct diagnosis, and the absence of some expected symptom or sign often does not invalidate an otherwise reasonable diagnosis. (Maurice Pappworth 1978)

The term "diagnostic greed" was coined by physician Maurice Pappworth to describe the rigidity of physicians in insisting on every classic symptom and physical sign be present before making a diagnosis. Pappworth explained that “overwhelming evidence is not essential for correct diagnosis, and the absence of some expected symptom or sign often does not invalidate an otherwise reasonable diagnosis.” He recorded that the correct question was "wherefore is this disease different from all other disease?" Coming to a correct diagnosis "is not like a jury's verdict. It does not have to be proved beyond a reasonable doubt."

== Examples ==
Where a person presents with a classic history associated with clearly recognisable symptoms and signs of a condition, a diagnosis can be confidently made with ease. However, clinical scenarios of the same disease frequently vary and insisting on an exact match before making the diagnosis may miss the diagnosis and therefore be considered a "sin of greed". One example is of kidney cancer, which classically presents with flank pain, blood in urine and a mass felt in the abdomen; a triad of features which present in less than 10% of cases. In practice, all "essential" features are rarely present and a person may reveal just a few classic features, which is where the request for testing plays a role in confirming or ruling out the suspected diagnosis.

In dermatology, every textbook feature of a lesion need not be present to make the diagnosis. Likewise, in cardiology, the expectation to explain every change on an ECG to conclude a diagnosis may represent diagnostic greed. Another example has been of lead poisoning, where toxicology results have failed to support the diagnosis despite other features of heavy metal poisoning being present.

Arguments for the need, on occasion, to have diagnostic greed, have also been made. Where a diagnosis may have considerable impact, additional tests providing supporting evidence might be required, making diagnostic greed advantageous.
