= Murtala Muhammad Specialist Hospital =

Murtala Muhammad Hospital
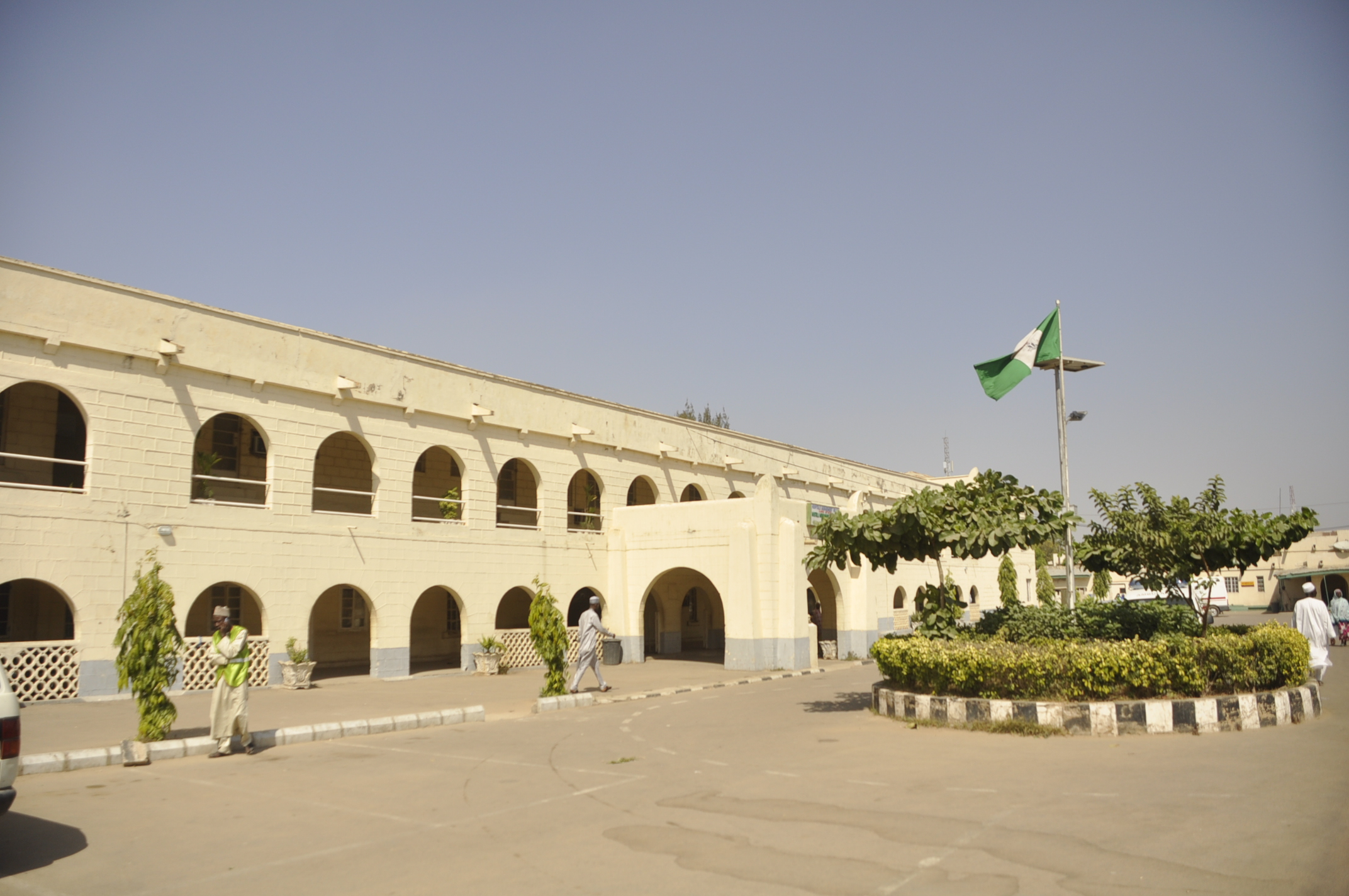

Geography
- Location: Kano, North west, Kano, Nigeria

Organisation
- Type: Teaching

Services
- Emergency department: Available
- Beds: Founded=1953

Links
- Lists: Hospitals in Nigeria

Murtala Muhammad Hospital, located in Kano, Kano State, Nigeria, is one of the healthcare institutions in the country. It is a government-owned tertiary health institution that provides specialized medical services to patients in the region. Established in 1953, the hospital has grown to become a major provider of healthcare services in the region. Named after the former Head of State of Nigeria, General Murtala Muhammad. The hospital is owned and operated by the Kano State Government, and it is one of the major healthcare facilities in the state. The hospital has a wide range of departments, including Obstetrics and Gynecology, Pediatrics, Surgery, Internal Medicine, Radiology, and Laboratory Services. It also has a fully-equipped Emergency Department that operates 24 hours a day, seven days a week.

== Departments ==
Murtala Muhammad Hospital, Kano has a wide range of clinical departments. Here is a list of some of the major clinical departments in the hospital:

- Cardiology Department
- Dermatology Department
- Endocrinology Department
- Gastroenterology Department
- Hematology Department
- Infectious Diseases Department
- Internal Medicine Department
- Nephrology Department
- Neurology Department
- Obstetrics and Gynecology Department
- Oncology Department
- Ophthalmology Department
- Orthopedics Department
- Pediatrics Department
- Psychiatry Department
- Pulmonology Department
- Radiology Department
- Rehabilitation Medicine Department
- Rheumatology Department
- Surgery Department
