= Sheshe =

Kano municipal ward

Sheshe (Persian: ششه) in Persian mythology is a jinni-like creature that strangles newborn babies on the 6th day of their lives.
