= Green report =

The Green report was written by Andrew Conway Ivy, a medical researcher and vice president of the University of Illinois at Chicago. Ivy was in charge of the medical school and its hospitals. The report justified testing malaria vaccines on Statesville Prison, Joliet, Illinois prisoners in the 1940s. Ivy mentioned the report in the 1946 Nuremberg Medical Trial for Nazi war criminals. He used it to refute any similarity between human experimentation in the United States and the Nazis.

== Background ==
Malaria experiments in the Statesville Prison were publicized in the June 1945 edition of LIFE, entitled "Prisoners Expose Themselves to Malaria".

When Ivy testified at the 1946 Nuremberg Medical Trial for Nazi war criminals, he misled the trial about the report, in order to strengthen the prosecution case. Ivy stated that the committee had debated and issued the report, when the committee had not met at that time. It was only formed when Ivy departed for Nuremberg after he requested then Illinois Governor Dwight Green to convene a group that would advise on ethical considerations concerning medical experimentation. An account stated that he wrote the report on his own after he cited its existence in the trial. It was later published in the Journal of the American Medical Association (JAMA).
