= Human Guinea Pigs =

Human Guinea Pigs: Experimentation on Man
- Author: Maurice Pappworth
- Language: English
- Subject: Medical ethics
- Publisher: Routledge and Kegan Paul
- Publication date: 1967

Human Guinea Pigs: Experimentation on Man is a book about unethical human experimentation, written by Maurice Pappworth and published by Routledge and Kegan Paul in 1967. In the 1970s the book prompted a change in the regulation of human research.

== Background ==
The book is an expansion of an essay by Maurice Pappworth that appeared in a 1962 issue of the journal Twentieth Century.
