= Andrew Conway Ivy =

American physician

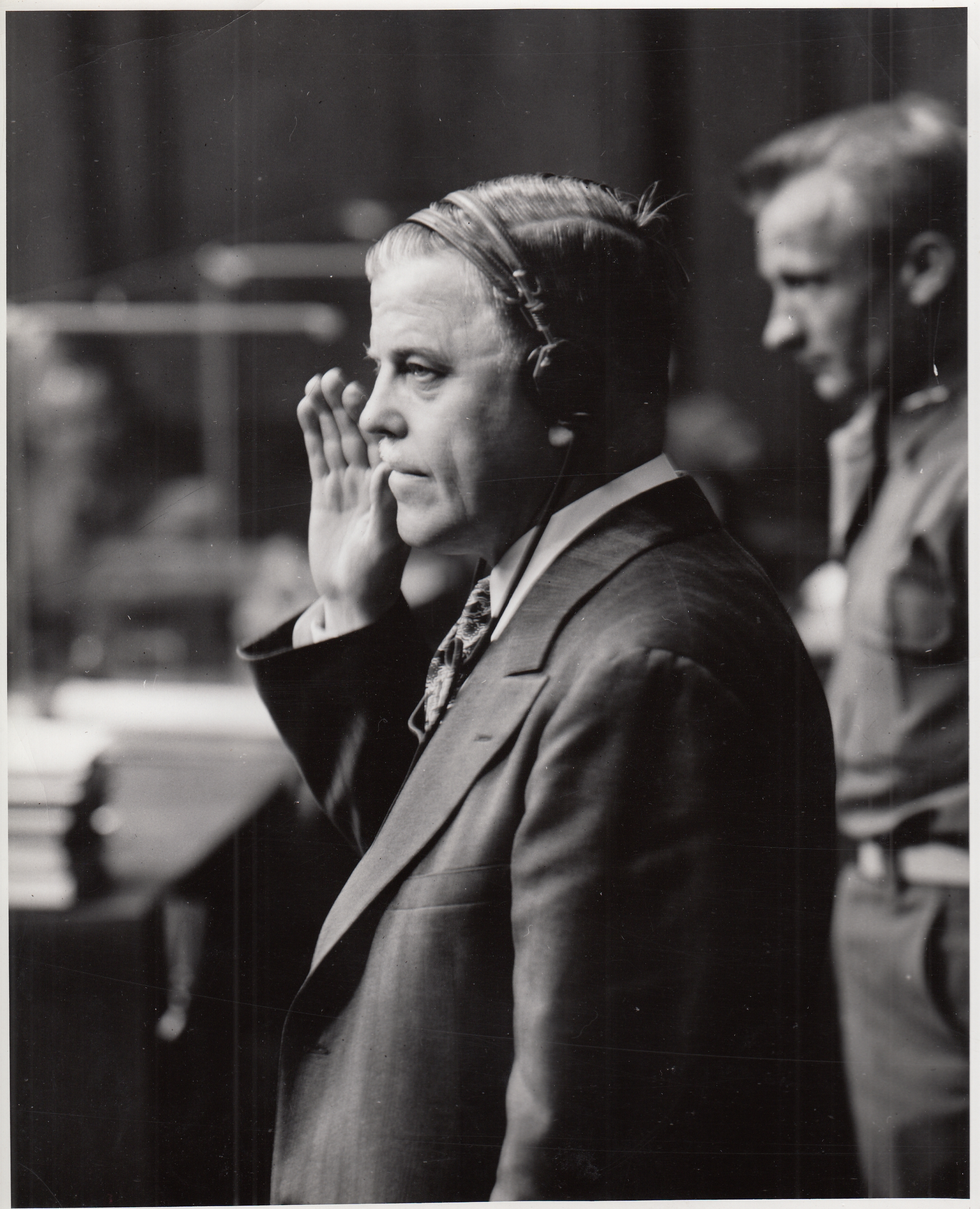
Andrew C. Ivy, testifies as an expert witness in the Doctors' Trial

Andrew Conway Ivy (February 25, 1893 – February 7, 1978) was an American physician. He was appointed by the American Medical Association as its representative at the Doctors' Trial, and later fell into disrepute for advocating the fraudulent drug Krebiozen.

== Personal life ==
Born in Farmington, Missouri, Ivy grew up in Cape Girardeau, Missouri. His father was a science professor and his mother was a teacher. Ivy trained in medicine and physiology in Chicago and taught at Northwestern University before becoming vice president of the University of Illinois, being responsible for the medicine, dentistry and pharmacy schools. From 1939 to 1941 he was president of the American Physiological Society. According to Jonathan D. Moreno, by the end of the war he was probably the most famous doctor in the United States. He was author of the Green report.

In 1919, he married Emma Anna Kohman, who had earned her PhD in physiology from the University of Chicago. The couple raised five sons, four of whom became physicians, while the fifth started a pharmaceutical company.

== Educational career ==
Ivy, described by Time as "one of the nation’s top physiologists" and "the conscience of U.S. Science," was referenced during the Nuremberg trials in 1946. At the trials, Werner Leibbrand was interrogated, and it became evident that the Germans questioning him were attempting to identify parallels between the medical research they conducted during the war and the human subjects research taking place in the United States, particularly at Stateville Penitentiary in Illinois. This line of questioning was unexpected by the United States delegation. The primary challenge in disputing these attempts was the lack of concrete guidelines or written documentation regarding the ethics of human medical experimentation.

After Ivy initially appeared at the Nuremberg courtroom in January 1947 and heard these proceedings, he returned to Illinois and asked Governor Dwight H. Green to establish a committee to assess the ethicality of the prisoner experiments that had taken place at Stateville. The governor agreed and sent out letters to potential candidates to join the committee, which ultimately consisted of six members and was collectively referred to as the "Green Committee." Ivy served as the lead of the committee.

During Ivy’s testimony at the trials in June 1947, the same attorney who had interrogated Leibbrant to draw parallels between German and U.S. human experimentation also questioned Ivy, this time focusing on the work of the Green Committee. After the trials, Ivy returned to Illinois and wrote a letter to the Green Committee members to share details of his testimony. Over the following months, the committee met and worked on a final report for Governor Green regarding the ethicality of the research at Stateville.

Their major conclusions were that "all subjects [prisoners at Stateville] have been volunteers in the absence of coercion in any form." The report was submitted to The Journal of the American Medical Association. The report was published in February 1948, and it represented an important support for future prisoner experimentation in the United States. The conclusions drawn in the report, which praised the practices taking place in the research at Stateville, denounced all criticism of the work and would encourage it more.

When Ivy testified at the Doctors' Trial, he misrepresented the status of the Green Committee report to strengthen the prosecution’s case. Ivy claimed that the committee had met, debated, and issued the report, though the committee had not convened at that time.

Additionally, Ivy introduced new ethical guidelines for human research, incorporating principles such as the Embryonic Code of August 1946, which endorsed animal experimentation as a means to protect human life, and the November 1947 statement, which urged physiologists and physicians to oppose antivivisectionist movements to advance medical progress and promote human welfare. Key elements of Ivy's principles for human experimentation included the necessity of informed consent, designing and planning experiments based on prior animal research to ensure societal benefit, and conducting experiments exclusively under the supervision of trained professionals to minimize risks of injury or disability to participants.

== Professional focus ==
As a physician, Ivy conducted research on cancer physiology and gastroenterology. He hypothesized that larger, multicellular organisms possess an "anticancer substance" that helps suppress cancer, which would theoretically be more likely to develop in organisms with more cells. He named this substance "carcalon." Ivy's work on the gastrointestinal system led to an influential publication titled Peptic Ulcer, co-authored with Morton Grossman and Bachrach. Over the course of his career, Ivy and his colleagues published more than 1,500 papers, and his research was cited more than any other researcher between 1964 and 1971. He is best known for his contributions to gastroenterology, where he made breakthroughs in understanding pancreatic and gastric secretions and discovered hormones such as cholecystokinin and urogastrone. His work also resulted in the development of new diagnostic procedures, including the "Ivy bleeding time," used to identify clotting abnormalities.

One breakthrough in gastroenterology made by Ivy was his observation of hunger inhibition by fat. In research presented at the Cold Spring Harbor Symposia on Quantitative Biology, Ivy and his team demonstrated that neutral fat in the upper intestine inhibits gastric secretion. This provided evidence for a possible humoral mechanism, acting through the blood, that suppresses hunger. The researchers further extracted an inhibitory agent from the upper intestinal mucosa capable of suppressing gastric secretions.

== Krebiozen ==
Ivy's reputation collapsed after 1949 when he steadfastly supported Krebiozen, an alleged cancer drug with no known beneficial effects. Stevan Durovic, the creator of the drug, claimed that the drug had cleared 7 of 12 dogs of cancer within six months, with the remaining five showing significant improvement. Accepting this at face value, Ivy began testing Krebiozen on humans within a month.

Within a year and a half, Ivy described the results as a "dramatic clinical improvement." At a press conference, he announced that none of the patients given Krebiozen had died of cancer. However, this claim was false—10 of the 22 patients in the trial had died of cancer, but Ivy attributed their deaths to other causes. The medical community sought to replicate Ivy's results with no success. Rather than retracting his claims, Ivy accused the American Medical Association and the American Cancer Society of suppressing the drug to block its entry into the market. Consequently, Krebiozen continued to be administered, often to terminally ill patients desperate for hope. By 1962, a foundation established by Ivy reported that 3,300 physicians had used Krebiozen to treat 4,227 patients.

Ivy's deception began to unravel 1959 when he began documenting a patient named Taietti, who had bladder cancer. Ivy claimed that the patient showed improvement and that the tumor had decreased in size. A Food and Drug Administration investigation later revealed that Taietti had died of bladder cancer in 1955. This deliberate falsification of information led to charges of fraud against Ivy. Although he was found not guilty in 1965, the scandal irreparably damaged his credibility, and he severed ties with Durovic.
