= Matthew B. Lawrence =

American legal scholar

Academic background
- Education: Brown University (BA); New York University (JD)

Academic work
- Discipline: Law
- Sub-discipline: Health Law, Administrative Law
- Institutions: Emory University School of Law

Matthew B. Lawrence is an American legal scholar serving as a professor of Law and Associate Dean of Faculty at Emory University School of Law. He is known for his scholarship in health law and administrative law, particularly how administrative law, appropriations law, and constitutional law influence large-scale health outcomes.

== Education ==
Lawrence graduated magna cum laude from Brown University with a Bachelor of Arts in International Relations in 2006. Lawrence then attended New York University School of Law, earning his Juris Doctor and graduating magna cum laude in 2009. At NYU Law, Lawrence served as Managing Editor of the New York University Law Review and earned the Paul D. Kaufman Memorial Award for most outstanding Law Review note.

== Career ==
=== Clerkship ===
Following law school, Lawrence served as a law clerk to the Honorable Douglas H. Ginsburg on the United States Court of Appeals for the District of Columbia Circuit.

=== Federal Government Service ===
Lawrence has federal litigation and regulatory experience, serving under several administrations:

- From 2010 to 2013 and 2015–2017, Lawrence served as a Trial Attorney in the Federal Programs Branch of the United States Department of Justice Civil Division.
- In 2017, Lawrence served as an Attorney Advisor for the Office of Management and Budget's Office of General Counsel.
  - Lawrence also served as an Intermittent Consultant for the Office of Management and Budget from 2017 to 2019.
- In 2020, Lawrence served as a Special Legal Advisor to the United States House Committee on the Budget's majority.
- From 2022 to 2023, Lawrence served as a senior advisor to the Drug Enforcement Administration.
- Lawrence currently serves as a public member of the Administrative Conference of the United States, appointed to the role beginning July 1, 2025.

=== Academia ===
From 2013 to 2015, Lawrence was a fellow at Harvard Law School's Petrie-Flom Center for Health Law Policy, Bioethics, and Biotechnology, where his research focused on civil procedure, health law, and administrative law. During this time, Lawrence designed and taught a course titled "Law and Medicine: The Affordable Care Act." Lawrence remains affiliate faculty at the Petrie-Flom Center.

From 2017 to 2020, Lawrence was an associate professor of law at Penn State Dickinson Law, where he also held a courtesy appointment as assistant professor at the Penn State College of Medicine in the Department of Surgery.

In 2020, Lawrence joined the faculty of Emory University School of Law. Lawrence became the Associate Dean of Faculty at Emory Law in 2024.

== Selected publications ==
=== Addiction and drug regulation ===
- "Regulatory Pathways to Promote Treatment for Substance Use Disorder or Other Under-Treated Conditions Using Risk Adjustment". Journal of Law, Medicine, and Ethics. 46 (4): 935–939. 2018. (peer-reviewed).
- "Deputizing Family: Loved Ones as a Regulatory Tool in the 'Drug War' and Beyond". Northeastern University Law Review. 11 (1): 195–250. 2019.
- "Addiction and Liberty". Cornell Law Review. 108: 259–343. 2023.
- "Defederalizing Opioid Addiction Care". San Diego Law Review. 62 (2): 193–253. 2025.
- Matthew B. Lawrence; David E. Pozen. "Drug Scheduling as Institutional Design". Harvard Law Review. 139 (4): 849–913. 2026.

=== Appropriations and fiscal law ===
- "Disappropriation". Columbia Law Review. 120 (1): 1–90. 2020.
- "Congress’s Domain: Appropriations, Time, and Chevron". Duke Law Journal. 70 (5): 1057–1107. 2021.
- "Subordination and Separation of Powers". Yale Law Journal. 131 (1): 78–174. 2021.
- "Medicare 'Bankruptcy'". Boston College Law Review. 63 (5): 1657–1728. 2022.
- "Second-Class Administrative Law: Lincoln v. Vigil’s Puzzling Presumption of Unreviewability". Washington University Law Review. 101 (4): 1029–1105. 2024.

=== Health law ===
- "Procedural Triage". Fordham Law Review. 84 (1): 79–130. 2015.
- "The Social Consequences Problem in Health Insurance and How To Solve It". Harvard Law & Policy Review. 13 (2): 593–660. 2019.
- "Against the 'Safety Net'". Florida Law Review. 72 (1): 49–71. 2020.
- "Parity Is Not Enough! Mental Health, Managed Care, and Medicaid". Journal of Law, Medicine, and Ethics. 48: 480–484. 2020.
- "Fiscal Waivers and State 'Innovation' in Health Care". William & Mary Law Review. 62 (5): 1477–1556. 2021.

=== Textbook ===
Lawrence is a co-author of The Law of American Health Care, a health law textbook centering federal statutory and regulatory law.

== Recognition ==
- Lawrence was named one of the Top 100 Legal Scholars of 2025 in a citation-based analysis by Rob Wiley and Melanie Knapp, law librarians at George Mason Law.
- In 2023, Lawrence received the Provost's Distinguished Teaching Award for Excellence in Graduate and Professional Education from Emory University School of Law.
- In 2017, Lawrence was selected as a health law scholar by the American Society of Law, Medicine, and Ethics.
- In 2016, Lawrence received an individual special commendation award from the Department of Justice for his work defending Affordable Care Act programs as a trial attorney.

== Media coverage ==
Lawrence has been quoted as a health law and administrative law expert in national outlets including NPR, Bloomberg, and The Atlantic. Many of Lawrence's notable appearances concern Medicaid waiver policy and federal agency litigation strategy. In February 2022, NPR quoted Lawrence on the Biden administration's reversal of Trump-era Medicaid waivers and in April 2022, NPR's Shots quoted him on the legal strategy behind the administration's delayed appeal of the federal mask mandate ruling.

== See also ==
- Administrative Conference of the United States
- Emory University School of Law
