= Journal of Law and Religion =

- Discipline: Law and religion
- Language: English
- Edited by: Center for the Study of Law and Religion

Publication details
- History: 1982-present
- Publisher: Cambridge University Press (United States)
- Frequency: Triannual

Standard abbreviations
- Bluebook: J.L. & Religion
- ISO 4: J. Law Relig.

Indexing
- ISSN: 0748-0814 (print); 2163-3088 (web)

Links
- Journal homepage

The Journal of Law and Religion (JLR) is a triannual peer-reviewed academic journal edited by the Center for the Study of Law and Religion (Emory University School of Law) and published in collaboration with Cambridge University Press. Its primary interests include topics related to the relationship between religion and law, including subjects related to theological jurisprudence and political theology.

== Editorial board ==
The journal's current editorial board members include:

Managing editor

- Silas Allard, senior fellow, Center for the Study of Law and Religion, Emory University

Co-Editors

- Michael J. Broyde, professor of law, Emory University
- M. Christian Green, senior fellow, Center for the Study of Law and Religion, Emory University
- Michael J. Perry, Robert W. Woodruff Professor of Law, Emory University
- John Witte, Jr., Robert W. Woodruff Professor of Law, Emory University
- Joseph E. David, associate professor of law, Sapir Academic College
- Donald R. Davis Jr., professor of Asian studies, University of Texas – Austin
- Rafael Domingo, Spruill Family Professor of Law and Religion, Emory University, and Alvaro d'Ors Professor of Law, University of Navarra
- Farid Esack, professor in the study of Islam, University of Johannesburg
- M. Cathleen Kaveny, Darald and Juliet Libby Professor of Law and Theology, Boston College
- Mirjam Künkler, fellow, Netherlands Institute for Advanced Study
- Linda C. McClain, Robert Kent Professor of Law, Boston University
- Mark L. Movsesian, Frederick A. Whitney Professor of Contract Law and co-director of the Center for Law and Religion, St. John's University
- Jaclyn L. Neo, associate professor of law and director of the Centre for Asian Legal Studies, National University of Singapore
- Mona Siddiqui, professor of Islamic and interreligious studies, University of Edinburgh
- Brent A. Strawn, professor of Old Testament and professor of law, Duke University

Special content editor

- M. Christian Green, Emory University

== History ==
The journal was founded by the Council on Religion and Law (CORAL) in 1982 and Hamline University School of Law provided the first editorial home for the journal. JLR published its first issue in the summer of 1983. Then Harvard Law Professor Harold J. Berman, Emory Law Professor Frank S. Alexander, and former Hamline University School of Law Dean Stephen B. Young are credited with spearheading and strongly supporting the creation of JLR.

JLR's inaugural general editors were Michael Scherschligt and Wilson Yates, and the editorial board included prominent scholars who would shape the emerging field of law and religion such as Douglas Sturm, Harold J. Berman, Edward Gaffney, Robin Lovin, and Thomas Porter.

In 2013, the journal moved to the Center for the Study of Law and Religion, based in Emory University's School of Law, where it continues to be edited and published in collaboration with the Cambridge University Press. The new editorial board's first issue was published in February 2014 (Volume 29, Issue 1). This issue focused on a symposium titled "The Pursuit of Happiness in Interreligious Perspective" featuring articles by the 14th Dalai Lama, Matthieu Ricard, Rabbi Jonathan Sacks, Professor Michael J. Broyde, Bishop Katharine Jefferts Schori, Professor Luke Timothy Johnson, Professor Seyyed Hossein Nasr, Professor Vincent J. Cornell, and Professor Khaled Abou El Fadl.

In 2021, to better fulfill its mission of publishing "cutting-edge interdisciplinary, interreligious, and international research on critical issues of law and religion," the journal added eleven new co-editors (see Editorial Board) with diverse disciplinary backgrounds and research interests from institutions in the United States, Europe, Africa, and Asia.

== Former editors ==
Former JLR editors include:

- Harold Berman (1983–1985)
- Rosalie Wahl (1983–1985)
- Milton Konvitz (1983–1991)
- Michael Scherschligt (1983–1995)
- Wilson Yates (1983–1998)
- Edward McGlynn Gaffney, Jr. (1983–2002)
- Douglas Sturm (1983–2004)
- Robin Lovin (1983–2000; 2003–2013)
- Thomas W. Porter, Jr. (1983–2013)
- Stephen B. Young (1986)
- John Lee Smith (1986–1988)
- Peter N. Thompson (1986–1988)
- Mary Ann Glendon (1987–1988)
- Gerard Bradley (1987–1990)
- George Latimer (1988–1991)
- Frank S. Alexander (1988–1995)
- Patrick R. Keifert (1988–2008)
- Mary Failinger (1988–2013)
- Howard J. Vogel (1988–2014)
- M. Cathleen Kaveny (1993–2000)
- Michael J. Perry (1991–2003; 2005–present)
- Stephen L. Carter (1991–2006)
- Nancy Miller-Herron (1991–2013)
- Emily Albrink Hartigan (1991–2013)
- Robert Sheran (1993)
- Raymond R. Krause (1993–1995)
- Azizah Y. Al-Hibri (1993–2005)
- Ze’ev Falk (1994–1995)
- Amina Wadud (1994–2000)
- Earl Schwartz (1995–2013)
- Edwin J. Butterfoss (1996–2003)
- Robert Yazzie (1999–2002)
- Howard Lesnick (1999–2013)
- Anthony E. Cook (2001–2010)
- Afra Jalabi (2001–2013)
- Jose Roberto Juarez (2001–2013)
- Steven D. Smith (2002–2005; 2009–2013)
- Jon M. Garon (2002–2008)
- Richard Quinney (2003–2006)
- Paula M. Cooey (2003–2013)
- Darryl Trimiew (2003–2013)
- Amelia Uelmen (2003–2013)
- Anver M. Emon (2005–2013)
- Asifa Quraishi-Landes (2005–2013)
- Russell Pearce (2005–2013)
- Kathleen Sands (2006–2013)
- Donald Lewis (2008–2013)
- Deborah J. Cantrell (2009–2013)
- Perry Dane (2010–2013)
- M. Christian Green (2010–2013)
- Abdullahi Ahmed An-Na'im (2014–2017)
- John Witte, Jr. (2014–present)
- Justin J. Latterell (2015–2019)
- Hina Azam (2015–2020)
