= Darren Hutchinson =

American legal scholar

Academic background
- Education: University of Pennsylvania (BA); Yale Law School (JD)

Academic work
- Discipline: Law
- Sub-discipline: Constitutional Law, Civil Rights
- Institutions: Emory University School of Law

Darren Lenard Hutchinson is an American legal scholar who serves as the inaugural John Lewis Chair for Civil Rights and Social Justice at Emory University School of Law, where he also directs the Emory University Center for Civil Rights and Social Justice. Hutchinson's scholarship focuses on constitutional equal protection doctrine, critical race theory, LGBTQ rights, and the intersection of race, sexuality, and social movements.

== Early life and education ==
Growing up, Hutchinson lived in Gainesville, Florida in the 1970s and 1980s. Hutchinson's mother worked as a teacher and his father was a blue-collar worker, he credits them with imparting on him the importance of education. Hutchinson has also said that his experiences with discrimination growing up in Gainesville inspired him to pursue studies in social justice.

Hutchinson earned a Bachelor of Arts from the University of Pennsylvania in 1990 and a Juris Doctor from Yale Law School in 1993. While at Yale, Hutchinson served as a research assistant to Professor Carol M. Rose and held an Olin Fellowship in Law, Economics, and Policy.

After law school, Hutchinson worked as a litigation associate at Cleary, Gottlieb, Steen & Hamilton in New York City, and clerked for Judge Mary Johnson Lowe of the U.S. District Court for the Southern District of New York.

== Academic career ==
Hutchinson began his teaching career at Southern Methodist University Dedman School of Law, where he taught constitutional law, critical race theory, equal protection theory, and remedies from 1997 to 2003. Hutchinson subsequently held a tenured faculty position at American University Washington College of Law from 2003 to 2013. Hutchinson then joined the University of Florida Levin College of Law, where he was names the Raymond & Miriam Ehrlich Eminent Scholar. Hutchinson has also served as a visiting professor at the University of Pennsylvania Carey Law School.

In April 2021, Emory University announced that Hutchinson would join its law faculty as the inaugural holder of the John Lewis Chair for Civil Rights and Social Justice, an endowed position named in honor of U.S. Representative and civil rights leader John Lewis. Fred O. Smith Jr., the Emory Law professor who led the national search for the chair, described Hutchinson as a "rigorous and courageous scholar" whose works in equal protection, LGBTQ rights, and critical race theory have "come to be regarded as classics." Hutchinson joined the Emory faculty on July 1, 2021. In 2022, Emory Law Dean Mary Anne Bobinski named Hutchinson director of the newly established Emory University Center for Civil Rights and Social Justice, created following a gift from the Southern Company Foundation.

Hutchinson has given lectures at numerous law schools, including Yale, Stanford, Columbia, the University of Pennsylvania, the University of Michigan, the University of California, Berkeley, Cornell, Georgetown, and Boston University. According to Google Scholar, Hutchinson's published work has been cited more than 2,700 times as of 2026.

== Scholarship ==
Hutchinson's scholarship examines equality law, criminal justice reform, LGBTQ rights, antiracism, and poverty, drawing on political science, history, and social psychology in addition to legal doctrine. Hutchinson's work has appeared in journals including the Yale Law Journal, California Law Review, Cornell Law Review, UCLA Law Review, and Washington University Law Review.

=== Race, sexuality, and equal protection ===
- "Gay Rights for Gay Whites? Race, Sexual Identity, and Equal Protection Discourse". Cornell Law Review. 85 (5): 1358–1391. 2000.
- "'Unexplainable on Grounds Other Than Race': The Inversion of Privilege and Subordination in Equal Protection Jurisprudence". University of Illinois Law Review. 2003 (3): 615–700. 2003.
- "'Not Without Political Power': Gays and Lesbians, Equal Protection, and the Suspect Class Doctrine". Alabama Law Review. 65 (4): 975–1034. 2014.

=== LGBTQ rights and social movements ===
- "Out Yet Unseen: A Racial Critique of Gay and Lesbian Legal Theory and Political Discourse". Connecticut Law Review. 29 (2): 561–645. 1997.
- "Sexual Politics and Social Change". Connecticut Law Review. 41 (5): 1523–1547. 2009.

=== Criminal punishment and racial justice ===
- "Undignified: The Supreme Court, Racial Justice, and Dignity Claims". Florida Law Review. 69 (1): 1–62. 2017.
- "Who Locked Us Up? Examining the Social Meaning of Black Punitiveness". Yale Law Journal. 127 (1): 2388–2447. 2018.
- "'With All the Majesty of the Law': Systemic Racism, Punitive Sentiment, and Equal Protection". California Law Review. 110: 371–429. 2022.

== Public commentary ==
Hutchinson has written for national outlets, including a July 2015 Washington Post op-ed, "There's Never Been a Better Time for Bail Reform," on criminal justice reform. Hutchinson has also been a contributing author for HuffPost, writing on constitutional law and civil rights. In 2010, Hutchinson was invited as a guest blogger for Concurring Opinions, a widely read legal blog by law professors. Hutchinson also runs a Facebook blog titled Dissenting Justice. Hutchinson has discussed civil rights and social justice issues in interviews with Atlanta media, including WABE's Closer Look, where he described the goals of Emory's Center for Civil Rights and Social Justice and connected his scholarly focus on social justice to his upbringing in the American South.

== See also ==
- Critical race theory
- Equal protection
- John Lewis
- Emory University School of Law
