= Kevin Outterson =

American lawyer

- Education: Northwestern University University of Cambridge University of Reading
- Occupation: Law professor
- Employer: Boston University School of Law
- Known for: Health Law, Intellectual Property Law, Antibiotic Resistance

Kevin Outterson is a lawyer, a professor of law and the Austin B. Fletcher Professor Boston University School of Law (2023-present). He is also the executive director of Combating Antibiotic-Resistant Bacteria Biopharmaceutical Accelerator (CARB-X), a global non-profit partnership that supports companies developing new antibiotics, diagnostics, vaccines and other products to address drug-resistant bacterial infections.

CARB-X receives funding from a global consortium of governments and foundations. These include the US Department of Health and Human Services Biomedical Advanced Research and Development Authority (BARDA), part of the Administration for Strategic Preparedness and Response (ASPR); Wellcome Trust, a global charitable foundation; the UK Government's Global Antimicrobial Resistance Innovation Fund (UK GAMRIF); the Gates Foundation; Germany's Federal Ministry of Research, Technology, and Space (BMFTR); the government of Canada; the Novo Nordisk Foundation; Italy's Ministry of Economy and Finance, and Japan's Ministry of Health. CARB-X also receives in-kind support from the National Institute of Allergy and Infectious Diseases (NIAID), part of the US National Institutes of Health (NIH). In 2022, CARB-X received a new commitment of funding from BARDA and Wellcome of up to $370 million. In 2023, the German and UK governments renewed funding to CARB-X, committing an additional €41 million and £24 million; the government of Canada committed CAD$6.3 million over two years; and The Novo Nordisk Foundation committed US$25 million over three years.

The G7 Health Ministers have cited CARB-X among the critical initiatives to support as the G7 governments renew their 2021 commitment to address the most dangerous drug-resistant infections. In May 2023, the global threat of Antimicrobial Resistance and the importance off supporting CARB-X as a global push incentive that coordinates and accelerates much-needed antibacterial innovation was featured in G7 Hiroshima Leaders’ Communiqué and the G7 Nagasaki Health Ministers’ Communiqué. The same year, G20 Health Ministers cited CARB-X as playing a critical role in accelerating antimicrobial R&D and access. In May 2024, the Antimicrobial Resistance (AMR) Multi-Stakeholder Partnership Platform issued a call for actionable steps to address the rising threat of AMR ahead of the United Nations General Assembly High-Level Meeting on AMR in September 2024. The call recommended increasing public investment in push incentives to catalyze global antimicrobial R&D efforts and cited CARB-X as a push mechanism that should be mobilized due to CARB-X’s critical role in supporting the discovery and development or new antimicrobials.

Outterson's research focuses primarily on the law and economics of antibiotic resistance–including push and pull incentives–health law, intellectual property, and global access to medicine.

Outterson has testified before Congress, the World Health Organization (WHO), UK Parliamentary working groups, and for the District of Columbia, Massachusetts, Vermont, California and West Virginia state legislatures.

He is co-director of the health law program at Boston University School of Law (2007–present) and associate fellow at the Royal Institute of International Affairs at Chatham House, London (2014–present). He served on the Board of the American Society of Law, Medicine & Ethics, and serves as faculty editor to the American Journal of Law & Medicine (2007–present). He is past editor-in-chief of the Journal of Law, Medicine & Ethics (2010–2016).
