= Joanna M. Shepherd =

American legal scholar

Academic background
- Education: Baylor University (BBA); Emory University (PhD)

Academic work
- Discipline: Law and Economics
- Institutions: Emory University School of Law

Joanna Mehlhop Shepherd-Bailey is an American legal scholar and economist serving as Thomas Simmons Professor of Law and Vice Dean at Emory University School of Law. Shepherd specializes in judicial behavior, judicial elections, tort reform, and empirical legal studies.

== Education ==
Shepherd earned a Bachelor of Business Administration at Baylor University in 1997, and completed a juris doctor degree in law and a PhD in economics at Emory University in 2002.

== Career ==
=== Academic Career ===
Shepherd began teaching at Clemson University, returning to Emory as a faculty member in 2005. In December 2019, Shepherd was named the Thomas Simmons Professor of Law. Shepherd served as Vice Dean at Emory from 2020–2023, and again beginning in 2024. In addition to her law school role, Shepherd serves as an adjunct professor in the Emory University department of economics, and is a nonresident scholar at the International Center for Law and Economics.

=== Congressional and Legislative Testimony ===
- Shepherd gave written and oral testimony before the House Judiciary Committee's subcommittee on Crime, Terrorism, and Homeland Security at a hearing on H.R. 2934, the Terrorist Penalties Enhancement Act of 2003. Shepherd discussed the deterrent effect of capital punishment.
- Shepherd testified before the House Judiciary Committee's Subcommittee on the Constitution and Civil Justice at a hearing titled Exploring Federal Diversity Jurisdiction, discussing her research on the effect of expanded diversity jurisdiction on federal court caseloads.
- Shepherd submitted written testimony to the House Energy and Commerce Committee's Subcommittee on Health, addressing pharmaceutical industry practices, including product hopping, that affect drug pricing and generic competition.

== Scholarship ==
Shepherd has published broadly in top law reviews, legal journals, and peer-reviewed economics journals. A 2016 analysis by Gregory Sisk considered Shepherd a highly cited legal scholar.

=== Books ===
- Butler, Henry N.; Shepherd, Joanna; Cooper, James C. (2024). Economic Analysis for Lawyers (4th ed.). Carolina Academic Press. ISBN 9781531026011.
- Kang, Michael S.; Shepherd, Joanna M. (2023-08-22). Free to Judge: The Power of Campaign Money in Judicial Elections. Stanford University Press. ISBN 9781503627611.

=== Judicial Elections and Campaign Finance ===
- Joanna Shepherd & Michael S. Kang. "Skewed Justice: Citizens United, Television Advertising, and State Supreme Court Justices' Decisions in Criminal Cases". American Constitution Society. 2014.
  - The findings of this study were cited by Justice Ruth Bader Ginsburg in her Concurrence in Williams-Yulee v. Florida Bar for the proposition that disproportionate campaign spending threatens both the appearance and the actuality of judicial independence.
- Michael S. Kang, Joanna M. Shepherd. "The Partisan Price of Justice: An Empirical Analysis of Campaign Contributions and Judicial Decisions". New York University Law Review. 86 (1): 69–130. 2011.
- Joanna M. Shepherd. "Money, Politics, and Impartial Justice". Duke Law Journal. 58 (4): 623–685. 2009.

=== Tort Reform ===
- Paul H. Rubin & Joanna M. Shepherd. "Tort Reform and Accidental Deaths". The Journal of Law and Economics. 50 (2): 221–238. 2007.
- Joanna M. Shepherd. "Tort Reforms' Winners and Losers: The Competing Effects of Care and Activity Levels". UCLA Law Review. 55 (4): 905–977. 2008.
- Joanna M. Shepherd. "Products Liability and Economic Activity: An Empirical Analysis of Tort Reform's Impact on Businesses, Employment, and Production". Vanderbilt Law Review. 66 (1): 255–321. 2013.

=== Judicial Behavior ===
- Joanna M. Shepherd. "Are Appointed Judges Strategic Too?". Duke Law Journal. 58 (7): 1589–1626. 2009.
- Michael S. Kang & Joanna M. Shepherd. "The Long Shadow of Bush v. Gore". Stanford Law Review. 68 (6): 1411–1452. 2016.
