= Tonja Jacobi =

Academic background
- Education: Australian National University (BA); Australian National University (LLB); University of California, Berkeley (MA); Stanford University (PhD)

Academic work
- Discipline: Law
- Sub-discipline: Judicial Behavior, Constitutional Law, Criminal Procedure
- Institutions: Emory University School of Law

Tonja Jacobi is an Australian American legal scholar who serves as the Sam Nunn Chair in Ethics and Professionalism and Professor of Law at Emory University School of Law. Jacobi is known for empirical research on U.S. Supreme Court judicial behavior, particularly her studies of interruptions and gender dynamics during Supreme Court oral arguments, work that has been publicly credited by sitting justices with contributing to a change in the Court's oral argument rules.

== Early life and education ==
Jacobi holds a Bachelor of Arts and a Bachelor of Laws, both with first class honors, from the Australian National University. She subsequently earned a Master of Arts in political science from the University of California, Berkeley, and a Ph.D. in political science from Stanford University, where her dissertation examined separation-of-powers constraints on the judiciary. Jacobi is admitted to the High Court of Australia bar.

== Academic career ==
Jacobi taught at Northwestern University Pritzker School of Law, where she held several named positions, including Assistant Professor (2004–2007), Associate Professor (2007–2008), William G. and Virginia K. Karnes Research Professor (2014–2016), and the Stanford Clinton Sr. and Zylpha Kilbride Clinton Research Professor (2019–2021).

In 2022, Jacobi joined the faculty of Emory University School of Law as the Sam Nunn Chair in Ethics and Professionalism. Jacobi served as co-president of the Society for Empirical Legal Studies and helped organize the 18th Annual Conference on Empirical Legal Studies, held at Emory in November 2024. Jacobi also acts as faculty advisor to both the American Constitution Society and the Federalist Society student chapters at Emory Law.

== Research ==
=== Supreme Court oral argument studies ===
Jacobi's research combines doctrinal, empirical, and formal methods to study how judges respond to institutional constraints, with a particular focus on U.S. Supreme Court oral arguments. Jacobi's most widely cited article, "Justice, Interrupted: The Effect of Gender, Ideology, and Seniority at Supreme Court Oral Arguments," co-authored with Dylan Schweers and published in the Virginia Law Review in 2017, found that female justices were interrupted at disproportionate rates by their male colleagues and by male advocates, and that ideological opponents interrupted each other more than allies did. The study received coverage in outlets including the New York Times, National Law Journal, and SCOTUSblog.

In October 2021, Justice Sonia Sotomayor publicly stated that research including the study by Jacobi and Schweers had an "enormous impact" on the Court and had contributed to Chief Justice John Roberts adopting a revised oral argument format, in part to curb interruptions of female justices. Jacobi's related work has also been referenced by Justice Ruth Bader Ginsburg.

=== Other research areas ===
Beyond oral argument, Jacobi's scholarship addresses constitutional criminal procedure, judicial coalition formation, judicial nominations and retirement, and the stability of constitutional systems. Jacobi has published in more than sixty peer-reviewed and law review journals and is the author of an open-access casebook, Constitutional Criminal Procedure: Investigations, produced in collaboration with students at Emory and Northwestern.

== Public commentary ==
Jacobi writes regularly for national outlets on Supreme Court behavior, judicial ethics, and the separation of powers, often translating her empirical research into commentary on current events.

On the Court's internal dynamics, Jacobi has argued that Chief Justice John Roberts should examine his own susceptibility to bias, that the justices' overall talkativeness at oral argument has shifted in wats that change how the public should read their questioning, and that the justices have grown more openly partisan in the questions they pose to advocates. Jacobi has been especially critical of how format changes affect the Court's female and liberal justices, arguing that the telephonic oral arguments adopted during the COVID-19 pandemic effectively muted them compared to the traditional in-person format.

On criminal justice and civil rights, Jacobi has argued that existing legal standards for police conduct are too permissive and that the Court should rule against police retaliation, and separately that the Court has largely failed to confront systemic racism within its criminal procedure jurisprudence.

Jacobi also authored Questions Presented, a recurring Bloomberg Law column running from April 2023 to April 2024 that addressed a range of contemporary controversies facing the Court, including judicial ethics reform, the Court's 2023 decision ending race-conscious admissions, the criminal proceedings against President Donald Trump, and reproductive rights.

== Selected publications ==
- Tonja Jacobi; Dylan Schweers. "Justice, Interrupted: The Effect of Gender, Ideology, and Seniority at Supreme Court Oral Arguments". Virginia Law Review. 103 (7): 1379–1496. 2017.
- Tonja Jacobi; Matthew Sag. "The New Oral Argument: Justices as Advocates". Notre Dame Law Review. 94 (3): 1161–1253. 2019.
- Lee Epstein; Tonja Jacobi. "Super Medians". Stanford Law Review. 61 (1): 37–99. 2008.
- Vanessa A. Baird; Tonja Jacobi. "How the Dissent Becomes the Majority: Using Federalism to Transform Coalitions in the U.S. Supreme Court". Duke Law Journal. 59 (2): 183–238. 2009.
- Tonja Jacobi; Sonia Mittal; Barry R. Weingast. "Judicial Review as a Self-Stabilizing Constitutional Mechanism". Comparative Judicial Review, edited by Erin F. Delaney and Rosalind Dixon. 2018.
