= Frank S. Alexander =

American academic

- Born: Frank Spruill Alexander; 1952 (age 73–74)
- Spouse: Joan Alexander
- Children: Daniel Alexander, Thomas Alexander, Graham Alexander

Academic background
- Education: University of North Carolina; Harvard University

Academic work
- Discipline: Law
- Institutions: Emory University
- Main interests: Law and religion

Frank Spruill Alexander (born 1952) is an American legal scholar, serving as the Sam Nunn Professor of Law at the Emory University School of Law. He is also General Counsel for Center for Community Progress.

== Early life and education ==
Alexander was born in 1952. He received his Bachelor of Arts degree from University of North Carolina in 1973 and later received his Juris Doctor and Master of Theological Studies degrees from Harvard University in 1978. He was a leading force on campus in organizing peaceful protests during the civil rights movement.

== Professional career ==
In 1982 Alexander co-founded Emory's Center for the Study of Law and Religion. The center was the first of its kind among American law schools and, at least initially, focused on producing scholarly interdisciplinary work on the interplay of Islam, Christianity, and Judaism. Many important legal scholars have worked at the center, including Harold J. Berman, Johan D. van der Vyver, Abdullahi Ahmed An-Na'im, and Michael Broyde. Other associated scholars include Martin E. Marty, Stephen G. Post, and Martha Albertson Fineman.

Alexander's focus is on community development and affordable housing. He is the nation's leading scholar on land-banking and a driving force in the movement to create land banks, which he describes as "governmental entities that specialize in the conversion of vacant, abandoned and foreclosed properties into productive use." He authored the seminal book in the field in 2005, Land Banks and Land Banking, and was instrumental in establishing the land bank in Flint, Michigan, and other communities. An updated version of this book is offered for free on the Center for Community Progress website.

Alexander has received numerous awards for his teaching and served as a past Chairman of Consumer Credit Counseling Service of Greater Atlanta. And he is a frequent commentator to NPR and other news sources on topics of urban development and the mortgage crisis.
