= Emory University School of Law =

Private law school in Atlanta, Georgia, US

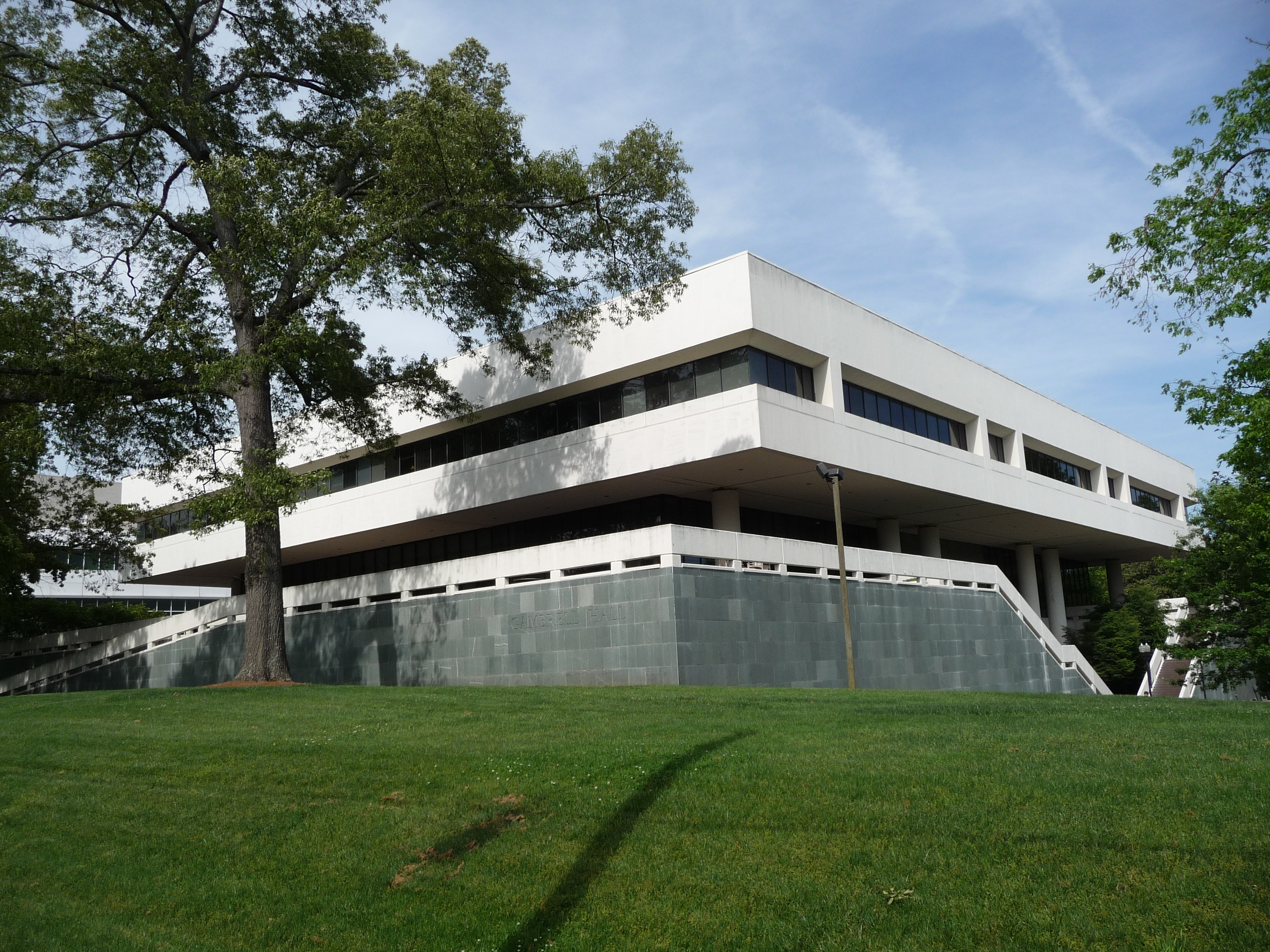
- Motto: Cor prudentis possidebit scientiam (Latin); The wise heart seeks knowledge (Proverbs 18:15)
- Parent school: Emory University
- Established: 1916; 110 years ago
- School type: Private
- Endowment: US $43 million
- Parent endowment: $11 billion (2021)
- Dean: Richard D. Freer
- Location: Atlanta, Georgia, U.S.
- Enrollment: 815
- Faculty: 56 (full-time); 142 (part-time)
- USNWR ranking: 40th (tied) (2026)
- Bar pass rate: 88.36% (2024 first-time takers)
- Website: law.emory.edu
- ABA profile: Standard 509 Report
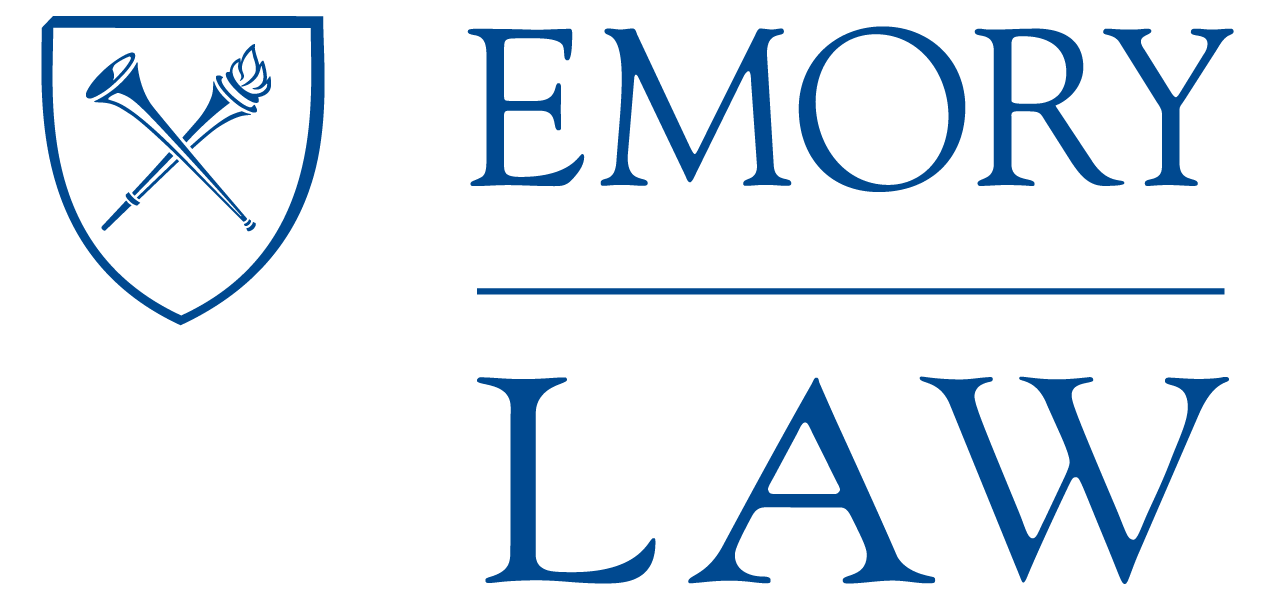

Emory University School of Law is the law school of Emory University, a private research university in Atlanta, Georgia. It was founded in 1916 and was the first law school in Georgia to be granted membership in the American Association of Law Schools.

== Campus ==
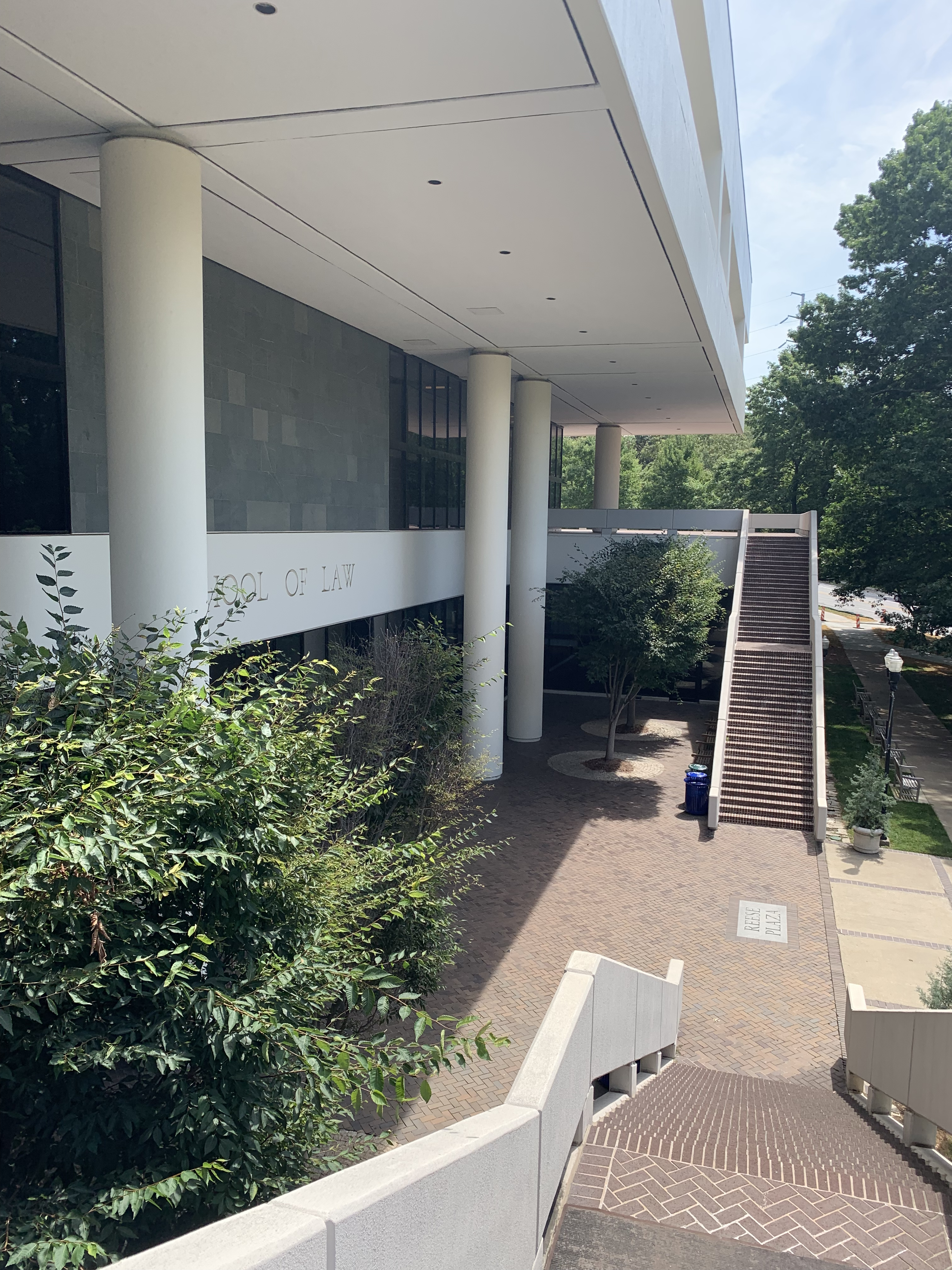
Emory University School of Law

Emory Law is located in Gambrell Hall, part of Emory’s 630-acre (2.5 km^{2}) campus in the Druid Hills neighborhood, six miles (10 km) northeast of downtown Atlanta.

Gambrell Hall

Gambrell Hall contains classrooms, faculty offices, administrative offices, student-organization offices, and a 325-seat auditorium. The school provides wireless Internet access throughout its facilities. Gambrell Hall also houses a courtroom.

Hugh F. MacMillan Library

Emory's five-story Hugh F. MacMillan Law Library opened in August 1995. The library is situated adjacent to Gambrell Hall and includes access to over 400,000 volumes and more than 4,000 serials subscriptions.

== Admissions and academics ==
=== Admissions ===
Admissions for Emory Law is somewhat selective. For the JD class entering in the fall of 2023, 40.87% of applicants were accepted with 19.53% of those accepted enrolling. The 25th and 75th LSAT percentiles for the Class of 2026 were 161 and 168, respectively, with a median of 166. The 25th and 75th undergraduate GPA percentiles were 3.62 and 3.93, respectively, with a median of 3.82.

Nearly half of Emory Law students are women, and about 32% are from underrepresented ethnic groups. Approximately 60% of students come from outside the Southeastern U.S.

=== Rankings ===
Emory Law is ranked 40th (tied) among ABA-approved law schools in the 2026 rankings by U.S. News & World Report. In the 2026 Above the Law (website) Top 50 Law School rankings, Emory Law is ranked 29th among ABA-approved law schools.

=== Juris Doctor Degree ===
The School of Law offers a three-year, full-time program leading to a Juris Doctor degree. Emory Law is particularly known for its expertise in Bankruptcy Law, Environmental Law, Feminist Legal Theory, Intellectual Property Law, International law, Law and Religion, and Transactional Law.

=== Joint-Degree Programs ===
Emory Law also offers joint-degree programs through cooperation with the Goizueta Business School (JD/MBA and JM/MBA), the Candler School of Theology (JD/MTS and JD/M.Div.), the Graduate School of Arts and Sciences (JD/Ph.D.), the Rollins School of Public Health (JD/MPH), the Emory Center for Ethics (JD/MA in bioethics), and joint JD and Master of Laws degree (JD/LLM) through Emory University School of Law.

=== LLM Programs ===
In partnership with Central European University, Emory also provides an LLM program for students with a U.S. law degree seeking advanced training in international commercial law and international politics. Emory also has a separate LLM program for qualified foreign professionals seeking training in international and comparative law.

=== Master of Legal Studies (MLS) Program ===
Emory Law's Master of Legal Studies degree is a 30-credit hour program that is intended to supplement a student's interest or professional experience in allied fields to law. The program offers a range of customized concentrations to allow students to enhance their skills in their home profession or interest area through a greater understanding of the law, legal concepts and frameworks. The coursework can be completed either full-time in nine months or part-time in up to four years.

== Clinics and programs ==
Students' expertise is developed through several clinics and programs. Emory Law also offers several summer study abroad programs in Budapest at the Central European University (CEU) and throughout the world.

Academic programs

A team from Emory Law's TI:GER IP/patent/technology program, a collaborative program between Emory and Georgia Tech, was featured on CNN Money. Other academic programs at Emory Law include:

- Environmental and Natural Resources Law Program
- Externship Program
- Transactional Law Certificate Program
- Kessler-Eidson Program for Trial Techniques
- Emory Law School Supreme Court Advocacy Program

Centers

- Barton Child Advocacy Center
- Center for Advocacy and Dispute Resolution
- Center on Federalism and Intersystemic Governance
- Center for International and Comparative Law
- Center for the Study of Law and Religion
- Center for Transactional Law and Practice
- Feminism and Legal Theory Project
- Global Health Law and Policy Project
- Project on War and Security in Law, Culture, and Society
- Vulnerability and the Human Condition Initiative

Clinics

- Barton Policy and Legislative Clinics
- Barton Appeal for Youth Clinic
- Barton Juvenile Defender Clinic
- International Humanitarian Law Clinic
- Turner Environmental Law Clinic
- Volunteer Clinic for Veterans

Externships

The law school has an externship program. Students have the opportunity to experience what it's like to work in a public defender or prosecutor's office, government agency, nonprofit organization, judge's chambers, or in-house counsel's office in the Atlanta metro area.

== Publications ==
- Emory Law Journal, which hosts the annual Randolph W. Thrower Symposium.
- Emory Bankruptcy Developments Journal, the only national bankruptcy journal edited and produced entirely by law students, which hosts an annual banquet.
- Emory Corporate Governance and Accountability Review, a law journal focusing on corporate law and compliance issues.
- Emory International Law Review, which publishes articles on topics ranging from human rights to international intellectual property issues.
- IP Theory (online only, published jointly with Indiana University Maurer School of Law)
- Journal of Law and Religion, a peer-reviewed, interdisciplinary journal edited by the Center for the Study of Law and Religion, with student participation, and published in collaboration with Cambridge University Press
- Emory Law journal articles are accessible online through its Open Access institutional repository, Emory Law Scholarly Commons

== Employment ==
According to Emory's official 2023 ABA-required disclosures, 89.1% of the Class of 2023 obtained full-time, long-term, JD-required, non-school funded employment (i.e. as attorneys) nine months after graduation. Emory's Law School Transparency under-employment score is 4.7%, indicating the percentage of the Class of 2023 unemployed, pursuing an additional degree, or working in a non-professional, short-term, or part-time job nine months after graduation.

== Costs ==
The total cost of attendance (indicating the cost of tuition, fees, and living expenses) at Emory for the 2023–2024 academic year is $96,884.

== Notable alumni ==
=== Academia ===
- Ben F. Johnson, former Dean of the Emory University School of Law and the Georgia State University College of Law, former member of the Georgia State Senate
- Sam Olens, former president of Kennesaw State University and former Attorney General of Georgia

=== Business ===
- John Chidsey, current CEO of Subway (restaurant) and former Executive Chairman and CEO of the Burger King Corporation
- C. Robert Henrikson, former chairman, president, and CEO of MetLife
- Jim Lanzone, CEO of Yahoo Inc., former CEO of Tinder, former president and CEO of CBS Interactive; former Chief Digital Officer of CBS Corporation
- Raymond W. McDaniel Jr., chairman of Moody's Corporation

=== Entertainment ===
- W. Watts Biggers, co-creator of the animated TV series Underdog
- Glenda Hatchett star of the television show Judge Hatchett
- Bobby Jones, former amateur golfer, founder and designer of the Augusta National Golf Club
- Bob Varsha, on-air personality for Speed

=== Government and politics ===
- David I. Adelman, former United States Ambassador to Singapore and member of the Georgia State Senate
- Luis A. Aguilar, (LL.M., J.D. from University of Georgia School of Law), former Democratic commissioner at the U.S. Securities and Exchange Commission
- Sanford Bishop, current U.S. Representative for Georgia's 2nd congressional district
- Wyche Fowler, former United States Congressman, former United States Senator Georgia, former United States Ambassador to Saudi Arabia
- Gordon Giffin, former United States Ambassador to Canada
- Carte Goodwin, former United States Senator of West Virginia
- Sam Nunn, former Georgia United States Senator
- Stefan Passantino, employee of the Trump Organization, former deputy counsel in President Trump's Office of White House Counsel, known for his representation of a witness in the Jan 6 Capitol attack House investigation
- Teresa Tomlinson, former mayor of Columbus, Georgia
- Randolph W. Thrower, former U.S. Commissioner of Internal Revenue

=== Judiciary ===
- Orinda D. Evans, former chief district judge of the United States District Court for the Northern District of Georgia
- Leah Ward Sears, former chief justice of the Supreme Court of Georgia

== Notable faculty ==
=== Current ===
- Ifeoma Ajunwa, Asa Griggs Candler Professor of Law and Associate Dean for Projects and Partnerships, scholar of employment law, artificial intelligence, and law and technology
- Mary Anne Bobinski, Asa Griggs Candler Professor of Law, former Dean of Emory University School of Law, health law scholar and past president of the American Society of Law, Medicine and Ethics
- Michael Broyde, Professor of Law and Berman Projects Director at Center for the Study of Law and Religion, scholar of Jewish law and comparative religious law
- Mary L. Dudziak, Asa Griggs Candler Professor of Law, legal historian and scholar of constitutional law, war and society, and U.S. foreign relations
- Martha Albertson Fineman, Robert W. Woodruff Professor of Law, feminist legal theorist and founder of the Feminism and Legal Theory Project, known for developing vulnerability theory
- Richard D. Freer, Dean and Charles Howard Candler Professor of Law, widely cited civil procedure scholar and Barbri lecturer
- Darren Hutchinson, John Lewis Chair for Civil Rights and Social Justice, scholar of critical race theory, constitutional law, and civil rights
- Tonja Jacobi, Sam Nunn Chair in Ethics and Professionalism, empirical legal scholar known for influential research on gender bias and Supreme Court oral argument behavior
- Matthew B. Lawrence, Professor of Law and Associate Dean of Faculty, health law and administrative law scholar known for work on appropriations law and the regulation of addiction, public member of the Administrative Conference of the United States
- Matthew Sag, Jonas Robitscher Professor of Law in Artificial Intelligence, Machine Learning, and Data Science, leading U.S. authority on copyright law and its application to AI
- Joanna M. Shepherd, Thomas Simmons Professor of Law and Vice Dean, law and economics scholar
- Stacie I. Strong, K.H. Gyr Professor of Private International Law, specialist in international arbitration who provided the initial impetus for the Singapore Mediation Convention
- John Witte Jr., Robert W. Woodruff Professor of Law, McDonald Distinguished Professor, Faculty Director of the Center for the Study of Law and Religion, legal historian and leading specialist in law, religion, marriage, and human rights

=== Former ===
- Abdullahi Ahmed An-Na'im, Charles Howard Candler Professor of Law Emeritus, internationally recognized scholar of Islamic law and human rights
- Frank S. Alexander, Sam Nunn Professor of Law Emeritus, leading scholar on land-banking and co-founder of the Center for Community Progress
- Kathleen Cleaver, former Senior Lecturer, civil rights attorney and former communications secretary of the Black Panther Party
- Michael J. Perry, Robert W. Woodruff Professor of Law Emeritus, scholar of constitutional rights, human rights theory, and law and religion
- Charles A. Shanor, Professor of Law Emeritus, scholar of employment discrimination and constitutional law, former general counsel of the Equal Employment Opportunity Commission
- Johan D. van der Vyver (1934–2023), I.T. Cohen Professor of International Law and Human Rights, South African anti-apartheid activist and prolific human rights scholar
