= Barry Furrow =

American lawyer

Barry R. Furrow is an American lawyer, currently at Drexel University and was former Editor-in-Chief of The Journal of Law, Medicine & Ethics.
