= DLJ =

DLJ may be an abbreviation for:

- Dalston Junction railway station, London Overground station, code DLJ
- Distributor Licence for Java
- Donaldson, Lufkin & Jenrette
- Drive Like Jehu, American 1990s post-hardcore band
- Duke Law Journal
