= Glenn McGee =

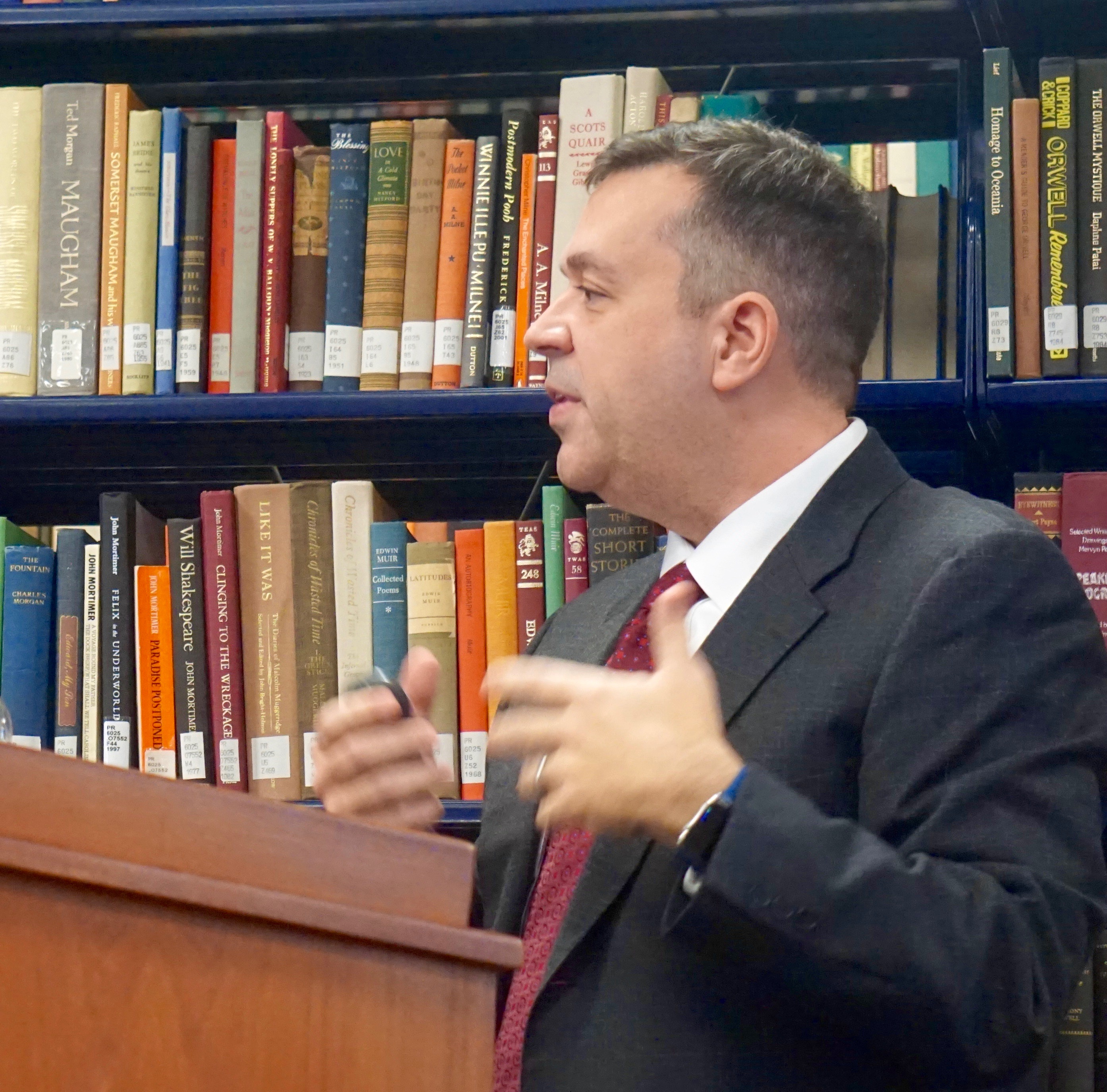
- Born: 1967 (age 58–59); Fort Worth, Texas
- Education: Baylor University, Vanderbilt University
- Website: https://www.salem.edu/people/glenn-mcgee

Glenn E. McGee (born 1967) is a professor of health sciences at Salem College, where he previously served as interim Dean of Admissions. He has been noted for his work on reproductive technology and genetics and for advancing a theory of pragmatic bioethics, as well as the role of ethicists in society and in local and state settings in particular.

== Life and career ==
McGee was raised in Waco, Texas. He earned a master's degree and Ph.D. in philosophy from Vanderbilt University and completed a post-doctoral fellowship in the Human Genome Project.

From 1995 to 2005, McGee was an assistant professor and associate director for education at the University of Pennsylvania Center for Bioethics, where he held joint appointments in philosophy, history and sociology of science, cellular and molecular engineering, and was a Fellow of the Leonard Davis Institute of Health Economics. In 1999, he founded and became the first editor-in-chief of The American Journal of Bioethics. In 2005, he moved to Union University in Albany, New York, as the John Balint, M.D. Professor of Medical Ethics and became director of the Alden March Bioethics Institute at Albany Medical College which had been founded in 1993 as the Center for Medical Ethics Education and Research by Balint. Three years later, after a legal case arising from the university's attempts to demote him as director and remove his endowed chair, he left the university. In 2009 he was appointed to the John B. Francis chair in bioethics at the Center for Practical Bioethics in Kansas City, succeeding John D. Lantos, inaugural holder of the chair. From 2014 to 2021 he served as a professor in the Department of Health Administration and Policy in the University of New Haven School of Health Sciences, where he taught public health and health law. He was appointed Deputy Provost and Special Assistant to the President in 2019, serving in that capacity until he joined Salem College in 2021.

== Publications ==
McGee has authored many scholarly articles, essays, reviews, three books, and edited a number of books both personally and as senior editor of the MIT Press Basic Bioethics book series, which he founded with Arthur Caplan. His proposal for a California cloning policy was reprinted in Great American Speeches, and a number of his articles have been reprinted in textbooks in bioethics, medical and other scientific fields. From 2005 to 2007, he wrote a monthly column for The Scientist, and during the same time a column for the Albany Times-Union. Prior to that, he co-wrote a column on bioethics for MSNBC.com.

=== Books ===
- Beyond Genetics ISBN 0-06-000801-6
- Bioethics for Beginners ISBN 978-0-470-65911-3
- The Human Cloning Debate ISBN 1-893163-69-5
- The Perfect Baby ISBN 0-8476-9759-2
- Pragmatic Bioethics ISBN 0-262-63272-1
- Pragmatism and Human Genetic Engineering ISBN 1-58112-020-6
- Who Owns Life ISBN 1-57392-986-7
