= Keisha Shantel Ray =

American bioethicist

- Title: John P. McGovern, MD Professor of Oslerian Medicine

Academic background
- Education: PhD in Philosophy University of Utah
- Thesis: Justice in health care: beyond the treatment/enhancement distinction (2013)

Academic work
- Discipline: Biomedical Ethics
- Sub-discipline: Applied Ethics
- Institutions: The McGovern Center for Humanities and Ethics at the University of Texas Health Science Center at Houston
- Website: www.keisharay.com

Keisha Shantel Ray is an American bioethicist. She is the John P. McGovern, MD Professor of Oslerian Medicine at the McGovern Center for Humanities and Ethics at the University of Texas Health Science Center at Houston.

== Education and focus of research ==
Ray graduated with B.A. in philosophy from Baylor University in 2007, and completed her PhD in philosophy at the University of Utah in 2013.

According to Ray, her work primarily focuses on the effects of institutional racism on Black people's health, highlighting Black people's own stories. Her work examines the ways that discrimination in our political and social lives contribute to Black people's worse than average health outcomes. She also researches the sociopolitical implications of biomedical enhancement, including how they widen the gap between those with good and those with bad health. Her work uniquely prioritizes linguistic justice as a matter of access and commitment to public scholarship.

== Affiliations ==
- American Journal of Bioethics, Digital Media Editor/Blog Editor, Associate Editor
- Journal of Clinical Ethics, Editorial Board
- Journal of Medical Humanities, Senior Associate Editor
- Kennedy Institute of Ethics Journal, Editorial Board
- Hastings Center Fellow

== Publications ==
=== Books ===
- Black Health: The Social, Political, and Cultural Determinants of Black People's Health. Oxford University Press. 2023. ISBN 9780197620267.
- Carlin, Nathan and Ray, Keisha. Medicine, Meaning, and Identity. Oxford University Press. 2025. IBSN 9780197697382.

=== Book Chapters ===
- Victor, Elizabeth; Guidry-Grimes, Laura K., eds. (2021). "Black and Sleepless in a Nonideal World". Applying Nonideal Theory to Bioethics: Living and Dying in a Nonideal World. Springer. ISBN 978-3-030-72502-0.
- Carlin, Nathan, ed. (2021). "Damon Tweedy: Stories on being Black, Sick, and Marginalized". Contemporary Physician-Authors: Exploring the Insights of Doctors Who Write. Routledge. ISBN 9781003079712.

=== Articles ===
- Ray, K. (2022). "Clinicians' Racial Biases as Pathways to Iatrogenic Harms for Black People". AMA Journal of Ethics. 24 (8): 768–772. doi:10.1001/amajethics.2022.768. PMID 35976934.
- "Ending Unequal Treatment Requires A Shift from Inequitable Health Care to Social Inequities". The Hastings Center - Bioethics Forum Essay. August 13, 2024.
- Ray, Keisha (2021). "In the Name of Racial Justice: Why Bioethics Should Care about Environmental Toxins". Hastings Center Report. 51 (3): 23–26. doi:10.1002/hast.1251. PMID 34028819.
- "Improving Linguistic Justice and Accessibility in Bioethics Work". The Hastings Center - Bioethics Forum Essay. October 6, 2023.
- Ray, Keisha Shantel (2019). "Intersectionality and Power Imbalances Clinicians of Color Face When Patients Request White Clinicians". The American Journal of Bioethics. 19 (2): 25–26. doi:10.1080/15265161.2018.1557292. PMID 31543021.
- Ray, Keisha Shantel (2021). "It's Time for a Black Bioethics". The American Journal of Bioethics. 21 (2): 38–40. doi:10.1080/15265161.2020.1861381. PMID 33534673.
- Ray, Keisha Shantel (2015). "Motivation's Pick-Me-Upper: Enhancing Performance Through Motivation-Enhancing Drugs". The American Journal of Bioethics Neuroscience. 6 (1): 50–51. doi:10.1080/21507740.2014.999888.
- Ray, Keisha Shantel (2016). "Not Just 'Study Drugs' for the Rich: Stimulants as Moral Tools for Creating Opportunities for Socially Disadvantaged Students". The American Journal of Bioethics. 16 (6): 29–38. doi:10.1080/15265161.2016.1170231. PMID 27216097.
- "Racism and Health Equity". The Hastings Center - Bioethics Briefings. August 30, 2023.
- "Stories and statistics: Creating culturally competent dentists using integrative race education in dental schools". Journal of the American College of Dentists. 88 (2): 11–17. July 21, 2021.
- "Treating all patients with compassion". Closler for Johns Hopkins University. May 2, 2023.
- Ray, Keisha S. (2024). "We Are Not Okay: Moral Injury and a World on Fire". The American Journal of Bioethics. 24 (4): 11–12. doi:10.1080/15265161.2024.2313947. PMID 38346157.Ray, Keisha Shantel (2020). "When People of Color Are Left out of Research, Science and the Public Loses". The American Journal of Bioethics Neuroscience. 11 (4): 238–240. doi:10.1080/21507740.2020.1830885. PMID 33196358.
- Ray, Keisha (2023). "When Black Health, Intersectionality, and Health Equity Meet a Pandemic". Journal of Bioethical Inquiry. 20 (4): 585–590. doi:10.1007/s11673-023-10299-8. PMID 37843674.
- Ray, Keisha Shantel (2020). "When People of Color Are Left out of Research, Science and the Public Loses". The American Journal of Bioethics Neuroscience. 11 (4): 238–240. doi:10.1080/21507740.2020.1830885. PMID 33196358.
- Fletcher, Faith E.; Ray, Keisha S.; Brown, Virginia A.; Smith, Patrick T. (2022). "Addressing Anti-Black Racism in Bioethics: Responding to the Call". The Hastings Center Report. 52 (S1): S3–S11. doi:10.1002/hast.1360. PMC 10118282. PMID 35470874.
- Ray, Keisha; Cooper, Jane Fallis (2024). "The Bioethics of Environmental Injustice: Ethical, Legal, and Clinical Implications of Unhealthy Environments". The American Journal of Bioethics. 24 (3): 9–17. doi:10.1080/15265161.2023.2201192. PMID 37104666.
- Ray, Keisha; Fletcher, Faith E.; Martschenko, Daphne O.; James, Jennifer E. (2023). "Black Bioethics in the Age of Black Lives Matter". Journal of Medical Humanities. 44 (3): 251–267. doi:10.1007/s10912-023-09783-4. PMC 9905759. PMID 36752936.
- Ray, Keisha S.; Zurn, Perry; Dworkin, Jordan D.; Bassett, Dani S.; Resnik, David B. (2024). "Citation bias, diversity, and ethics". Accountability in Research. 31 (2): 158–172. doi:10.1080/08989621.2022.2111257. PMC 9938084. PMID 35938378.
- Jacobs, Edward; et al. (2024). "The Hopkins-Oxford Psychedelics Ethics (HOPE) Working Group Consensus Statement". The American Journal of Bioethics. 24 (7): 6–12. doi:10.1080/15265161.2024.2342764. PMID 38695382.
- Germain, Sabrina; Ray, Keisha (2024). "Book review: Shedding Light on Racial Inequity in Health, in Conversation with the Author: Black Health: The Social, Political, and Cultural Determinants of Black People's Health". Medical Law International. 24 (2): 151–158. doi:10.1177/09685332231211914.
- Taylor, Lauren A.; Udeagbala, Osaze; Biggs, Adam; Lekas, Helen-Maria; Ray, Keisha (2021). "Should a Healthcare System Facilitate Racially Concordant Care for Black Patients?". Pediatrics. 148 (4): e2021051113. doi:10.1542/peds.2021-051113. PMID 34479982.
- Beasley, Heather K.; Clark, Alexandra L.; Garner, Aleena; Heyward, Frankie D.; Moore, Erika; Nelson, Robin G.; Ray, Keisha; Silvers, Sophielle; Stephens, Dominique; Woappi, Yvon (2023). "What does Juneteenth mean in STEMM". Cell. 186 (12): 2501–2505. doi:10.1016/j.cell.2023.05.011. PMID 37295394.
