= Mary Anne Bobinski =

American legal scholar and educator

14th Dean of Emory University School of Law
- In office August 1, 2019 – July 1, 2024
- Preceded by: James B. Hughes Jr.
- Succeeded by: Richard D. Freer

Personal details
- Born: 1962 (age 63–64) Cortland, New York
- Education: University at Buffalo (BA, J.D.); Harvard University (LL.M.)
- Occupation: Legal scholar and educator

Mary Anne Bobinski (born 1962) is an American legal scholar and educational administrator who served as the dean of the Emory University School of Law from 2019 to 2024. She was the dean of the Allard School of Law at the University of British Columbia from 2003 to 2015 and is a past President of the American Society of Law, Medicine and Ethics.

Bobinski was born in Cortland, New York and studied at the State University of New York at Buffalo where she received her BA in psychology in 1982 and her JD in 1987. She served a judicial clerkship with Max Rosenn of the U.S. Court of Appeals for the Third Circuit and then did further study at Harvard Law School, receiving her LL.M. in 1989. She joined the faculty of the University of Houston Law Center in 1989 as an assistant professor. She served as Director of the Health Law and Policy Institute there from 2001 and from 2002 was the John and Rebecca Moores Professor of Law. In 2003 she was appointed Dean of the Allard School of Law at the University of British Columbia and served in that post through 2015. She is a current (December 2017) member of the Committee of the Allard Prize for International Integrity.

On May 23, 2019, Emory University announced the appointment of Bobinski as Dean of Emory University School of Law, making her the first woman to serve in the role since Emory Law's founding in 1916. She was succeeded for the role by Richard D. Freer on July 1st, 2024. Bobinski currently serves as Asa Griggs Candler Professor of Law at Emory.

== Selected Publications ==
=== Books ===
- Hall, Mark A.; Bobinski, Mary Anne; Orentlicher, David; Cohen, I. Glenn; Bagley, Nicholas; Sawicki, Nadia N. (2024-02-21). Health Care Law and Ethics (10th ed.). Wolters Kluwer. ISBN 9781543838862.
- Orentlicher, David; Bobinski, Mary Anne; Cohen, I. Glenn; Hall, Mark A. (2024-09-15). Bioethics and Public Health Law (5th ed.). Wolters Kluwer. ISBN 9798889065913.
- Hall, Mark A.; Sawicki, Nadia N.; Bobinski, Mary Anne; Orentlicher, David; Cohen, I. Glenn (2024-09-17). Medical Liability and Treatment Relationships (5th ed.). Wolters Kluwer. ISBN 9798889062844.

=== Articles ===
- "Unhealthy Federalism: Barriers to Increasing Health Care Access for the Uninsured". UC Davis Law Review. 24 (2): 255–348. 1990.
- "Autonomy and Privacy: Protecting Patients from Their Physicians". University of Pittsburgh Law Review. 55 (2): 291–388. 1994.
- "Patients and Providers in the Courts: Fractures in the Americans with Disabilities Act". Albany Law Review. 61 (3): 785–830. 1998.
- "Health Disparities and the Law: Wrongs in Search of a Right". American Journal of Law & Medicine. 29 (2-3): 363–380. 2003.
- "The Health Insurance Debate in Canada: Lessons for the United States". Connecticut Insurance Law Journal. 14 (2): 341–375. 2008.
- "Law and Power in Health Care: Challenges to Physician Control". Buffalo Law Review. 67 (3): 595–692. 2019.
