= David H. Webber =

American legal scholar

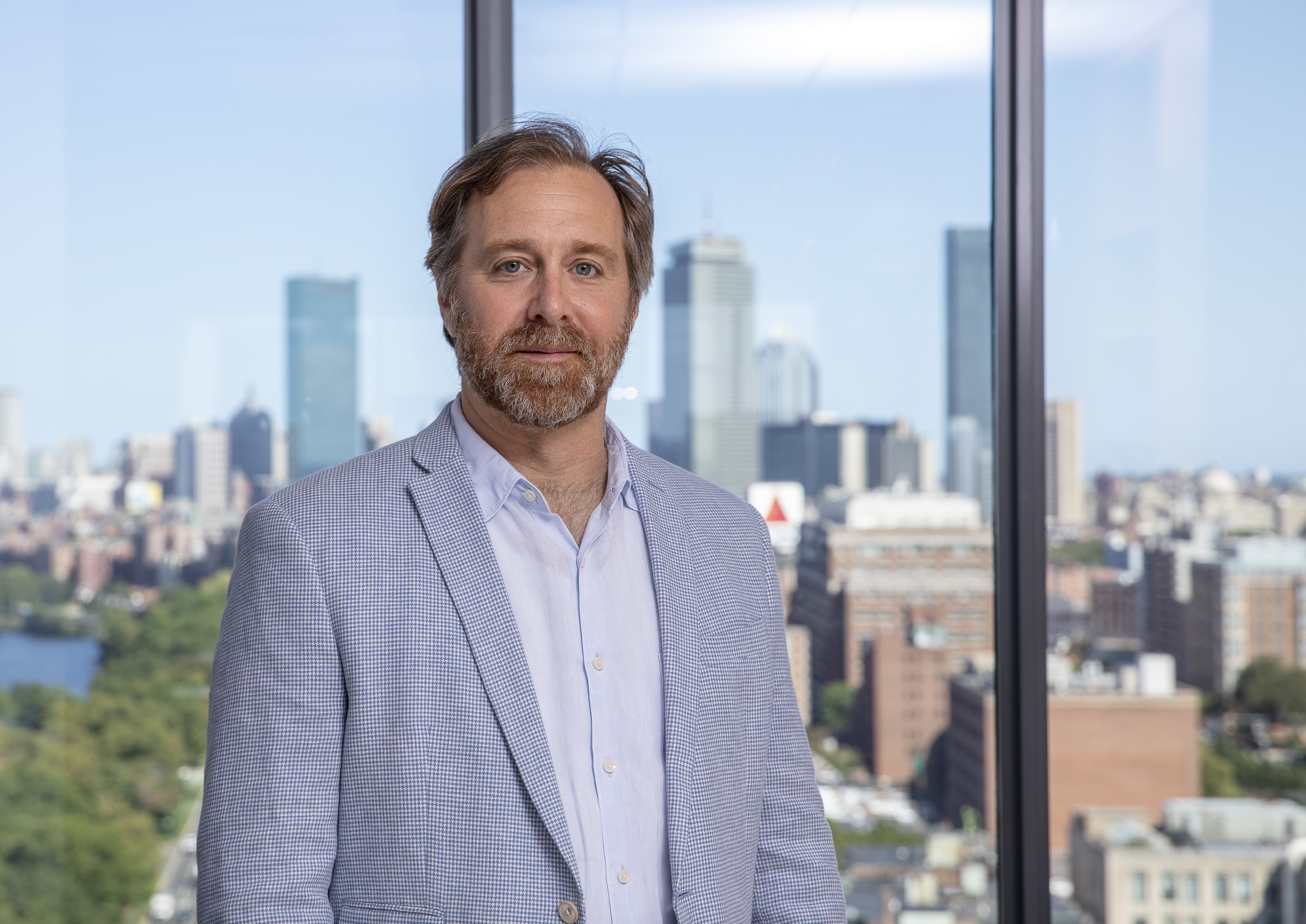
- David H. Webber, Associate Dean for Intellectual Life, Boston University School of Law
- Education: Columbia University; New York University School of Law
- Occupations: author, law professor
- Employer: Boston University School of Law

David H. Webber is the author of The Rise of the Working Class Shareholder: Labor's Last Best Weapon and Associate Dean for Intellectual Life at Boston University School of Law, where he writes about shareholder activism and litigation.

== Biography ==
Webber graduated from Columbia University magna cum laude with a B.A. in history and earned his Juris Doctor from New York University School of Law, where he was an editor for the New York University Law Review. Webber joined the faculty at Boston University School of Law in 2010 and became the Associate Dean for Intellectual Life in July 2019. He also co-teaches a class on Pensions and Capital Stewardship in the Trade Union Program at Harvard Law School. He has appeared on C-SPAN's Book TV Minnesota Public Radio's Marketplace, the David Feldman Show, The David Pakman Show, the Social Europe podcast, and Knowledge@Wharton Business Radio, and written opinion pieces for The New York Times, The Washington Post, and the Los Angeles Times.

== Scholarship ==
=== The Rise of the Working-Class Shareholder: Labor's Last Best Weapon ===
In this nonfiction book, Webber argues that public pension plans can use their voice as shareholders, both publicly and privately to individual board members, to influence corporate decision making. He asserts public pension plans are better positioned to do this than other shareholders because they do not have as many conflicts of interest and as long-term shareholders, their interests are aligned with the long-term interests of a company. However, labor may also be able to collaborate with other shareholders to achieve mutually beneficial ends. Although pension plans have a duty to act in workers' best interests, "Webber makes a good case that there is no logical reason always to define those workers' interests narrowly, as just their future retirement benefits." Where employee contributors' current jobs are threatened by the actions of an wiktionary:investee, it would be in the contributors' best interests to influence the investee's actions even if it ultimately results in a lower return for the pension plan. Criticism of expanding workers' interests beyond return on investment is that some private sector workers would receive a lower retirement return in order to help other workers in the present. For public retirees receiving defined benefit pensions, taxpayers have to pay the difference if returns are lower due to activist activities.

Webber has identified multiple threats to this kind of shareholder activism, including moves from centrally-managed pension plans to individual 401(k)s and Janus v. American Federation of State, County, and Municipal Employees, Council 31, which held that unions cannot collect fees from non-union members. Webber believes these threats have been championed by Conservatives, including the Koch Brothers, for political gain. A narrow definition of fiduciary duty to the fund, as opposed to the beneficiaries, under the Employee Retirement Income Security Act of 1974 and state retirement plan laws is another threat. This issue has not yet been taken up by the Supreme Court of the United States. Benjamin Friedman notes, "[w]hat Webber's book presents is not a legal argument but rather an economic and political one, and recent experience suggests that economic and especially political arguments count for a lot in determining what the Justices decide on any given issue before them."

The Rise of the Working-Class Shareholder: Labor's Last Best Weapon has been reviewed in The New York Review of Books, the Financial Times, Forbes, Dissent, Cornell University's Industrial and Labor Relations Review, and Publishers Weekly. Webber's book tour included over 40 stops across the United States, including the Los Angeles Times Festival of Books, as well as talks in Belgium, Portugal, England, and Israel.

A Korean edition of the book was published by Max Media in 2020.

=== Shareholder activism and litigation ===
Webber has been invited to speak on shareholder activism by academic institutions, labor groups, and lawyers associations worldwide. He believes shareholder activism is important because corporations are very powerful, and their actions impact everyday citizens just as much as government action.

Webber has also expressed concerns about the possible effects if class actions were not available for shareholder litigation, noting this would create a system where institutional investors could recover for wrongs perpetrated by a corporation, but smaller investors would not pursue relief on their own. He has been critical of the Private Securities Litigation Reform Act, because in determining the most adequate plaintiff, it favors investors with a larger dollar amount interest in the outcome over investors whose interest is a larger percentage of their assets. Webber feels the latter may be more committed to aggressively pursuing economic relief, and has suggested courts should select a representative individual investor to serve as a co-lead plaintiff with a larger institutional investor. He has found that institutional investors, such as Fidelity, Vanguard, and TIAA-CREF often avoid being a lead plaintiff because they are concerned competitors will benefit from the litigation without contributing to the costs. Hedge funds, which also may have extensive resources invested, often avoid being the lead plaintiff because they do not want to be subject to discovery demands that would expose their investing strategies. He has also asserted that when corporations require arbitration of shareholder claims, the goal is to shift the cost-benefit analysis so that it does not seem worthwhile to bring the claim.

Webber has examined data to determine whether pay-to-play impacts which law firms represent pension funds in securities litigation, and found that politically controlled pensions are less likely to seek lead plaintiff appointments than pensions whose board members are also pension beneficiaries. However this study has been criticized for not looking at law firm campaign contributions. Other studies have found a relationship between law firm campaign contributions and their selection as lead counsel by those elected officials.

=== Mergers and acquisitions ===
Webber has conducted empirical research into who brings lawsuits to challenge mergers and acquisitions in Delaware, and found pension funds are often the lead plaintiffs in these suits. He also found that when institutional investors are named as the lead plaintiffs, it is more likely that the final price will exceed the initial offer and there are lower attorneys' fees.

=== Books ===
- Research Handbook on Representative Shareholder Litigation (co-edited with Sean Griffith, Jessica Erickson, and Verity Winship, Elgar, 2018)
- The Rise of the Working-Class Shareholder: Labor's Last Best Weapon (Harvard University Press, 2018).

=== Articles ===
Webber's most-cited articles include:

- Is Pay-to-Play Driving Public Pension Fund Activism in Securities Class Actions: An Empirical Study, 90 B.U. L.Rev. 2031 (2010).
- Private Policing of Mergers and Acquisitions: An Empirical Assessment of Institutional Lead Plaintiffs in Transactional Class and Derivative Actions, 38 Del. J. Corp. L. 907 (2013).
- Shareholder Litigation without Class Actions, 57 Ariz. L. Rev. 201 (2015).
- The Plight of the Individual Investor in Securities Class Actions, 106 Nw. U.L. Rev. 157 (2012).
- The Use and Abuse of Labor's Capital, 89 N.Y.U. L. Rev. 2106 (2014).
- Shareholder Value(s): Index Fund ESG Activism and the New Millennial Corporate Governance co-authored with Michal Barzuza and Quinn Curtis, was voted a 2020 Top Corporate and Securities Law Article in a survey of law scholars conducted by Corporate Practice Commentator.

== See also ==
- Fiduciary duty and pension governance
- Socially responsible investing
