= David Magnus =

- Title: Professor of medicine and biomedical ethics Professor of pediatrics and medicine

Academic background
- Education: University of California, Riverside (BA); Stanford University (PhD)

Academic work
- Institutions: Stanford University
- Main interests: Bioethics
- Website: med.stanford.edu/profiles/david-magnus

David Magnus is the Thomas A. Raffin Professor of Medicine and Biomedical Ethics and professor of pediatrics at Stanford University. He is also the director of the Stanford Center for Biomedical Ethics and the co-chair of the Ethics Committee at Stanford Hospital.

== Early life ==
Magnus completed his undergraduate work at the University of California at Riverside, where he majored in philosophy. He completed his graduate work at Stanford University, receiving a PhD in philosophy.

== Career ==
He has since become a researcher in the field of bioethics, publishing over 100 articles, book chapters, and reviews on a wide range of topics, including organ transplantation, genetics, stem cell research, end of life care, patient communication, and research ethics. He is a co-founder and current editor-in-chief of the American Journal of Bioethics, and is a former president of the Association of Bioethics Program Directors.

Magnus has served on the National Research Council Ad Hoc Committee on the Bioconfinement of Genetically Engineered Organisms and on the California Human Stem Cell Research Advisory Committee. He has also consulted for both the World Bank on food security and biotechnology and the National Conference of State Legislatures on cloning.

He is currently the vice-chair of the institutional review board for the Precision Medicine Initiative "All of Us" program.

Magnus also served as the principal editor of a collection of essays entitled Who Owns Life? (2002).

== Media ==
In addition to his scholarly work, he has published opinion pieces in the Chicago Tribune, The Philadelphia Inquirer, The Star-Ledger, and the San Jose Mercury News.

Magnus has appeared on The Today Show, 60 Minutes, Good Morning America, ABC World News Tonight, Fox News Sunday, CBS This Morning, and NPR.
