= Raymond W. McDaniel Jr. =

American financial executive (born 1958)

- Born: Raymond Whitehead McDaniel, Jr. January 5, 1958 (age 68)
- Education: Colgate University (BA); Emory University (JD)
- Occupations: President and chief executive officer of Moody's Corporation
- Known for: Moody's Corporation

Raymond Whitehead McDaniel, Jr. (born January 5, 1958) is an American financial executive. He is chairman of Moody's Corporation, the parent company of Moody's Investors Service and Moody's Analytics.

== Education ==
McDaniel earned a B.A. in political science from Colgate University, and a J.D. from Emory University School of Law. In 1984 McDaniel was admitted to the New York State Bar.

== Career ==
=== Moody's Corporation ===
McDaniel joined Moody's Investors Service in New York in 1987 as an analyst in Asset Securitization. In 2001 he became president of Moody's Investors Service, and was elected to the Moody's Corporation board of directors in 2003. McDaniel became chief operating officer of Moody's Corporation in January 2004. From October 2004 until April 2005 McDaniel served as president of Moody's Corporation. In April 2005, McDaniel was named chairman and CEO of Moody's Corporation He served as the chairman of the board of directors from 2005 to 2012, when Henry McKinnell was named Chairman of the Board of Directors. In 2012, as part of the decision to split the role of chairman and CEO, he again became president of Moody's Corporation, where he currently oversees the company's two divisions; Moody's Investors Service and Moody's Analytics.

Other positions held by McDaniel during the course of his Moody's career include managing director and executive vice president within the Global Ratings and Research division of Moody's Investors Service. He also held the roles of managing director for Moody's Europe in London and managing director for international operations, which designs and manages regional expansion in Asia, Europe, and the Americas. According to Moody's Corporation, under McDaniel's leadership, the company has expanded its reach into new worldwide markets and broadened the range of new products, experiencing the best financial performance in the company's history

Between 2007 and 2009, Moody's and other credit rating agencies were the subject of criticism for their ratings of subprime mortgage backed securities. McDaniel testified regarding the ratings at U.S. congressional hearings on multiple occasions, where he stated he was "deeply disappointed with the performance of ratings associated with the housing sector."

In 2010, McDaniel was the subject of some media scrutiny due to sales of company stock prior to a drop in Moody's share value, and coincident with the company's receipt of a Wells notice from the SEC. Although some observers expressed skepticism about McDaniel's actions amid the timing of the stock sales, Moody's stated that McDaniel's sales had been part of a pre-arranged plan under SEC Rule 10b5-1.

Moody’s and other credit rating agencies were again the subject of scrutiny with respect to the European Sovereign crisis. In March 2012, McDaniel published an article on Moody’s website called "A Solution for the Credit Rating Agency Debate" in which he urged public institutions frustrated with private-sector credit ratings to start a public credit-ratings firm that could provide "competing views".

At the Milken Institute Global Conference in May 2011, McDaniel cautioned against using ratings in a "mechanistic" way, where changes in rating automatically produce market effects. He had previously advised that investors should use ratings as a tool rather than a specific market strategy, in testimony before the Financial Crisis Inquiry Commission in 2010. He has endorsed rules and regulations that increase market transparency and quality of ratings, as long as they do not interfere with the independence of ratings content produced by private agencies.

=== Other positions held ===
McDaniel joined the board of directors of the Council for Economic Education (then the National Council on Economic Education) in 2003, and has helped expand its workshops in New York City public schools. In September 2005, he joined the board of directors of the global publishing company John Wiley & Sons. McDaniel has appeared as a speaker at the Milken Institute Global Conference in 2011 and 2012.
