= Michael Broyde =

American rabbi and legal scholar (born 1964)

Michael Jay Broyde
- Born: May 12, 1964 (age 61)
- Citizenship: United States
- Education: Yeshiva University (BA); New York University (JD)
- Employer: Emory University School of Law
- Title: Professor of law and the Academic Director of the Law and Religion Program

Michael Jay Broyde (born May 12, 1964) is an American legal scholar. He is a professor of law and the academic director of the Law and Religion Program at Emory University. He is also a senior fellow in the Center for the Study of Law and Religion at the university. His primary areas of interest are law and religion, Jewish law and Jewish ethics, and comparative religious law. Broyde has published 200 articles on various aspects of law and religion and Jewish law, and a number of articles in the area of federal courts.

== Personal ==
Broyde is married to lawyer Channah S. Broyde, and has four children: Joshua, Aaron, Rachel, and Deborah. Two of his children live in Israel. He lives in Toco Hills, Georgia.

== Biography ==
Broyde holds a Juris Doctor from New York University Law School, from which he graduated in 1988. He clerked for Judge Leonard I. Garth of the United States Court of Appeals for the Third Circuit. In 1989 he was an associate at the law firm Davis, Polk & Wardwell.

He received his B.A. in 1984 and was ordained as a rabbi in 1991 by Yeshiva University, and was a member (dayan) of the Beth Din of America. Broyde was the first rabbi of the Young Israel of Toco Hills in Atlanta, Georgia.

He is a professor of law and the academic director of the Law and Religion Program at Emory University School of Law. He is also a senior fellow in the Center for the Study of Law and Religion at Emory University.

Broyde was a member of the Rabbinical Council of America, and resigned from it in February 2014.

During the 2017–2018 academic year, he was a visiting professor at the University of Warsaw Law School in Poland and in the Interdisciplinary College of Law in Herzliya, Israel.

In 2018, Broyde won a Fulbright scholarship to study religious arbitration. During 2018–2019, Broyde was a Senior Fulbright Scholar at Hebrew University of Jerusalem, where he is working on manuscripts on religious arbitration, kidney transplants and vouchers, Jewish law and modesty, and a modern explication of the Book of Genesis, while translating A Concise Code of Jewish Law for Converts into Hebrew.

== Publications ==
Broyde has written books and delivered speeches on Jewish law, Mishpat Ivri, and Jewish ethics. His primary areas of interest are law and religion, Jewish law and Jewish ethics, and comparative religious law. Broyde has written 200 articles and book chapters on various aspects of law and religion and Jewish law, and a number of articles in the area of federal courts.

Broyde has published on topics ranging from issues of contemporary relevance to more academic matters. He published two books in 2017. One of the works, A Concise Code of Jewish Law for Converts, is a compendium on Jewish law as is relates to converts. His other recently published book, Sharia Tribunals, Rabbinic Courts, and Christian Panels: Religious Arbitration in America and the West, explores the rise of this phenomenon in recent years.

== Controversy ==
In April 2013, The Jewish Channel reported that Broyde had created a pseudonym with which he joined online the International Rabbinic Fellowship, and commented on his own posts on Jewish blogs, and that he had published articles in Jewish periodicals under the pseudonym. It further alleged that he created another pseudonym, which he used to publish testimonies of deceased rabbis agreeing with his own view on women's hair covering. Broyde admitted to and issued an apology regarding the former allegations, but denied the latter allegation. Emory University, in an investigation into Broyde's alleged actions, "did not find evidence to substantiate any conduct beyond that which Professor Broyde acknowledged. Specifically, the Committee did not find evidence to substantiate" the latter allegation. Furthermore, the committee found that "the conduct did not violate Emory policies that govern allegations of research misconduct".

== Selected works ==
- Editor, Marriage, Sex, and Family in Judaism (Lanham, Md.: Rowman & Littlefield Publishers, 2005).
- Marriage, Divorce and the Abandoned Wife in Jewish Law: A Conceptual Approach to the Agunah Problems in America. (Hoboken, N.J.: Ktav, 2001).
- "Honesty and Analysis: A Response to Passionate Critics," Edah Journal 5(1):1–42 (Summer 2005), found online at www.edah.org, this article deals with the abandoned wife (agunah).
- Marriage, Divorce and the Abandoned Wife in Jewish Law: A Conceptual Understanding of the Agunah Problems in America
- "Jewish Law and the Abandonment of Marriage: Diverse Models of Sexuality and Reproduction in the Jewish View and the Return to Monogamy in the Modern Era," in Marriage, Sex, and Family in Judaism (Lanham, Md.: Rowman & Littlefield Publishers, 2005), 88–115.
- With Jonathan Reiss. "The Ketubah in America: Its Value in Dollars, its Significance in Halacha and its Enforceability in American Law," The Journal of Halacha and Contemporary Society 47:101–124 (2004). ('Ketubah' is a marriage contract)
- "קידושי טעות בזמנינו" (lit. "Mistaken Marriage in our Time"), Tehumin 22:231–242 (in Hebrew)(2003).
- "The 1992 New York Get Law: An Exchange," Tradition: A Journal of Jewish Thought 31(3):23–41 (1997). (A get is a divorce document.)
- "Can There be Solutions to the Agunah Problem", JOFA Journal 5(4):8–9 (Summer 2005).
- Review of "Between Civil and Religious Law: The Plight of the Agunah in American Society by Irving Breitowitz," in AALS Jewish Law Section Newsletter, May 1993, pp. 2–4.
- "Religious Freedom in the Domain of Family Law" (lecture and faculty colloquium) and "The Jewish Religion and Human Rights Politics in the Near East," University of Tübingen, Germany, January 15–16, 2007.
- “The Hidden Influence of Jewish Law on the Common Law: One Lost Example”. Emory Law Journal 57 (2008): 1403–08
