= John D. Lantos =

American pediatrician and medical ethicist

- Born: 12 October 1954 (age 71)
- Website: www.johnlantos.com

John D. Lantos (born 12 October 1954) is an American pediatrician and a leading expert in medical ethics. He was Professor of Pediatrics at the University of Missouri–Kansas City School of Medicine and Director of the Children's Mercy Bioethics Center at Children's Mercy Hospital. Lantos has been cited over 1,000 times in scientific literature as of 2024.

== Career and work ==
Lantos earned his MD from the University of Pittsburgh School of Medicine in 1981 and did his residency at the Children's National Medical Center. He was on faculty at the Pritzker School of Medicine for two decades, before he moved to Kansas City where he was the inaugural holder of the John B. Francis Chair in Bioethics at the Center for Practical Bioethics. He then became the founding director of the Children's Mercy Bioethics Center at Children's Mercy Hospital and Professor of Pediatrics at the University of Missouri–Kansas City School of Medicine.

His research fields are bioethics, doctor–patient communication, research ethics, end-of-life care, and religion and medicine, and especially the ethics of clinical trials. He is a former president of the American Society of Bioethics and Humanities and of the American Society of Law, Medicine and Ethics, and is an advisor to the American Academy of Pediatrics on bioethics issues.

He is a member of the PCORI Advisory Panel on Clinical Trials. He has published over 250 journal papers and book chapters and five books on bioethics. According to Google Scholar, Lantos has been cited over 16,000 times in scientific literature and has an h-index of 62.

Lantos has appeared on The Oprah Winfrey Show, Larry King Live, National Public Radio and Nightline. He has been an associate editor of the American Journal of Bioethics, Pediatrics, and Perspectives in Biology and Medicine. He is an active member of the Congregation Beth Torah, a modern Reform Jewish congregation which emphasizes ethical living, spiritual and personal growth, and social justice, and also writes and lectures on religious and philosophical issues in relation to healthcare. He was formerly married to the pediatrician Nancy Fritz.

== Selected works ==
- Kidney to Share. Martha Gershun and John D. Lantos. Cornell University Press, 2021. ISBN 978-1-5017-5544-6.
- Bioethics in the Pediatric ICU: Ethical Dilemmas Encountered in the Care of Critically Ill Children Laura Miller-Smith, Asdis Wagner, John D. Lantos. Springer 2019. ISBN 978-3-030-00942-7. doi:10.1007/978-3-030-00943-4
- Pediatric Collections Ethics Rounds: A Casebook in Pediatric Bioethics John D. Lantos (American Academy of Pediatrics, 2019).
- Neonatal Bioethics John D. Lantos, William L. Meadow, Johns Hopkins University Press, 2006. ISBN 978-0-8018-8344-6.
- Controversial Bodies: Thoughts on the Public Display of Plastinated Corpses, edited by John D. Lantos, MD (Johns Hopkins University Press, 2011). ISBN 978-1-4214-0271-0.
- The Lazarus Case: Life and Death Issues in Neonatal Intensive Care, by John Lantos, Johns Hopkins University Press, 2001. ISBN 978-0-8018-6762-0.
- The Last Physician: Walker Percy and the Moral Life of Medicine, edited by Carl Elliott and John Lantos, Duke University Press, 1999. ISBN 978-0-8223-2336-5. doi:10.1215/9780822398431
- Do We Still Need Doctors?, by John Lantos, Routledge, 1997. ISBN 978-0-415-92495-5.
