= Wendy Mariner =

- Spouse: John Tobias Nagurney

Academic background
- Education: Wellesley College (BA); Columbia University (JD); New York University (LLM); Harvard University (MPH)

Academic work
- Discipline: Law; Public health
- Sub-discipline: Health law Social medicine
- Institutions: Boston University

Wendy K. Mariner is an American academic who is the Edward R. Utley Professor of Health Law, Bioethics & Human Rights in the Department of Health Law, Bioethics & Human Rights, at the Boston University School of Public Health. She is also a professor of law at Boston University School of Law and a professor of socio-medical sciences and community medicine at Boston University School of Medicine.

== Education ==
Mariner earned a Bachelor of Arts degree from Wellesley College, a Juris Doctor from Columbia University School of Law, Master of Laws from New York University School of Law, and Master of Public Health from the Harvard School of Public Health.

== Career ==
Mariner is a specialist in health law, and has published more than 100 articles in the legal, medical and health policy literature, such as "Social solidarity and personal responsibility in health reform," "The Supreme Court's limitation of managed-care liability," and "What recourse? Liability for managed care decisions and the Employee Retirement Income Security Act."

She is chair of the Boston University Faculty Council. She also serves as co-director of the Boston University Clinical and Translational Science Institute's Division on Regulatory Knowledge and Research Ethics and is Faculty Director of the JD–MPH dual degree program at Boston University.

Mariner has served as a member of the Massachusetts Health Facilities Appeals Board, the National Institutes of Health's AIDS Policy Advisory Committee, the CIOMS/WHO Steering Committee for International Ethical Guidelines for Biomedical Research Involving Human Subjects, and the executive board of the American Public Health Association.

She is a member of the Massachusetts Health Care Quality and Cost Council Advisory Committee, charged with implementing the Commonwealth's health reform legislation, the Massachusetts Public Health Association Board of Directors, and is a founding member of the New England Coalition for Law and Public Health..

As legal director for a BUSPH project, she assisted the Russian Federation in developing health reform legislation.

She was the American Journal of Public Health's Contributing Editor for Health Law and Ethics. She and George Annas and Leonard Glantz have submitted amicus curiae briefs to the United States Supreme Court in several cases involving health law issues.

== Personal life ==
She is married to John Tobias Nagurney, a physician.
