= Angela Onwuachi-Willig =

American legal scholar

- Alma mater: Grinnell College; University of Michigan Law School; Yale University
- Occupation: Dean, professor, scholar

Angela Onwuachi-Willig (born 1973) is a Nigerian-American legal scholar. She is dean and professor of law at Boston University School of Law and an expert in critical race theory, employment discrimination, and family law. She took the position in August 2018, having previously been the Chancellor's Professor of Law at the University of California, Berkeley.

== Early life and education ==
Onwuachi-Willig was born in the United States and grew up in Texas.

She attended Grinnell College for her bachelor's degree and graduated in 1994 with membership in Phi Beta Kappa. She received her J.D. from the University of Michigan in 1997, where she was a Clarence Darrow Scholar. She was also the Michigan Law Review note editor, and an associate editor for the founding issue of the Michigan Journal of Race & Law.

After law school, she clerked for United States District Court Judge Solomon Oliver of the Northern District of Ohio and US Sixth Circuit Judge Karen Nelson Moore. She went on to receive her Ph.D. in sociology and African American studies from Yale University. She practiced law as a labor and employment associate at Jones Day in Cleveland, Ohio and Foley Hoag in Boston, Massachusetts.

== Career ==
Onwuachi-Willig joined the faculty of the University of Iowa College of Law in 2006. In 2011, she was one of nine finalists nominated to fill three open seats with the Iowa Supreme Court. She was the youngest nominee, as well as the only woman and only member of a racial minority. She was not selected.

Onwuachi-Willig subsequently joined the University of California, Berkeley, where she held the title of Chancellor's Professor of Law.

In 2018, she was named the new dean of Boston University School of Law, succeeding Maureen O'Rourke.

In 2021, she was elected to the American Academy of Arts and Sciences.

== Awards ==
- AALS Derrick Bell Award (2006)
- Fellow, American Bar Foundation (2011)
- Association of American Law Schools (AALS) Clyde Ferguson Award (2015)
- Gertrude Rush Award (2016) from the Iowa Organization of Women Attorneys
- John Hope Franklin Jr., Prize (2018) from the Iowa Chapter of the National Bar Association Law and Society

== Personal life ==
Onwuachi-Willig is married to physicist Jacob Willig-Onwuachi.
