= Boston University School of Law =

Private school in Boston, Massachusetts, US

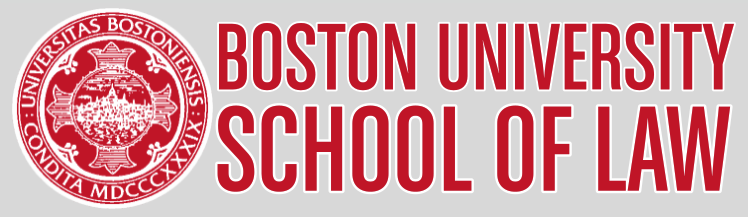
- Parent school: Boston University
- Established: 1872
- School type: Private law school
- Dean: Angela Onwuachi-Willig
- Location: Boston, Massachusetts, U.S.
- Enrollment: 980
- Faculty: 91 (full-time) 121 (part-time)
- USNWR ranking: 22nd (tie) (2025)
- Bar pass rate: 94.93% (2025 first-time takers)
- Website: bu.edu/law
- ABA profile: Standard 509 Report

The Boston University School of Law (BU Law) is the law school of Boston University, a private research university in Boston. Established in 1872, it is the third-oldest law school in New England, after Harvard Law School and Yale Law School. Approximately 630 students are enrolled in the full-time J.D. degree program (approximately 210 per class) and about 350 in the school's five LLM degree programs. BU Law was one of the first law schools in the country to admit students to study law regardless of race or gender.

== History ==
The Boston University School of Law was founded in 1872. It was one of the first law schools to admit women and minorities, at a time when most other law schools barred them. In 1881, Lelia J. Robinson became the first female BU Law graduate. During that time, less than half of one percent of the profession were women. Upon graduation, she successfully lobbied the Massachusetts legislature to permit the admission of women to the state bar, and in 1882, became the first woman admitted to the Massachusetts bar. Her classmate, Nathan Abbott, would later become the founding dean of Stanford Law School. Another prominent female alumna at the time, Alice Stone Blackwell, would go on to help found the League of Women Voters and edit the Woman's Journal. Takeo Kikuchi (1877), the school's first Japanese graduate, was co-founder and president of Tokyo's English Law School which grew into Chuo University. Clara Burrill Bruce (1926) was the first black woman elected editor-in-chief of a law review (the Boston University Law Review).

BU Law's first buildings were 36 Bromfield Street, 18–20 Beacon Street and 10 Ashburton Place. The first year of courses commenced in 1872. In 1895, the university's trustees acquired 11 Ashburton Place, which was refurbished and named Isaac Rich Hall in honor of the third founder of Boston University. The dedication speaker was Oliver Wendell Holmes Jr. whose historic speech The Path of the Law was delivered in 1897. In 1918, former United States President William Howard Taft lectured on legal ethics at BU Law until his appointment as chief justice of the Supreme Court two years later. In 1921, the Boston University Law Review was founded.

Isaac Rich Hall housed BU Law until 1964. In 1964 BU Law occupied the bottom half of the current building, 765 Commonwealth Avenue on the Charles River Campus, colloquially known as the "Tower". BU Law shared the Tower with the School of Education for some years but now occupies the entire building. The School of Law's legal library, the Fineman & Pappas Law Libraries, occupies three floors in the Law Complex, spanning both the Law Tower and the Redstone Building. The Libraries also include two floors of closed stacks in the basement of the adjacent Mugar Memorial Library, BU's main library. The entire BU Law tower underwent a multi-million dollar refurbishment from 2014 to 2018.

In 1975, BU Law began publishing the American Journal of Law & Medicine. In July 2016, the United States Department of Health and Human Services announced a new partnership allowing BU Law to serve as headquarters for a $350 million initiative researching and combating antibiotic-resistant diseases, CARB-X. Professor Kevin Outterson, a health law specialist and researcher at BU Law, serves as executive director of the initiative, which is named CARB-X.

== Academics ==
Boston University School of Law offers the J.D. and Master of Laws (LL.M.) degrees as well as numerous dual degrees with a student to faculty ratio of 12:1. This curriculum covers 19 different areas of legal study.

There are 19 study abroad opportunities at BU Law, including five dual-degree programs with international universities. The campus offers five moot court opportunities, seven academic concentration tracks, over 20 different clinical and experiential programs, and legal writing on six academic journals. Certain dual-degree JD/LL.M. programs and dual degree programs across Boston University are also offered.

=== Admissions ===
BU Law's class entering in 2025 came from 33 states, including Washington, D.C. The class represented 16 countries and 118 undergraduate institutions. Students of color comprised 46% of the class.

Admission to Boston University School of Law is very competitive. For the class entering in 2024, BU Law accepted 1279 (20.61%) of applicants, with 208 of those accepted enrolling, a 16.26% yield rate. Seven students were not included in the statistics. The average enrollee had a 170 LSAT score and 3.88 undergraduate GPA. Eight students were not included in the GPA calculations.

=== Rankings ===
Boston University School of Law was ranked tied 22nd among American law schools in the 2025 list of best law schools compiled by U.S. News & World Report. U.S. News also ranked the school's Health Law program fifth and Intellectual Property Law program 11th. For 2021, BU Law was ranked eighth for graduates with the best debt-to-salary ratio. In 2022, it was ranked 29th by the Above The Law Top 50 Law Schools list for post-graduate gainful employment.

=== Attorney Skills Accelerator Program ===
The Attorney Skills Accelerator Program (ASAP) at Boston University School of Law offers summer classes, clinics, and externships for qualified J.D. students enrolled in accredited law schools. During Summer 2017, ASAP students will be able to enroll in Contract Drafting and/or Negotiation courses. ASAP students have the additional opportunity to take part in a legal externship, or one of three clinics:

- Entrepreneurship & IP Clinic
- Legislative Policy & Drafting Clinic
- Criminal Law: Prosecutor Clinic

== Law journals ==
- Boston University Law Review
- American Journal of Law & Medicine
- Review of Banking & Financial Law
- Boston University International Law Journal
- Journal of Science & Technology Law
- Public Interest Law Journal

== Costs ==
The total cost of attendance (indicating the cost of tuition, fees, and living expenses) at BU Law for the 2017–18 academic year was $74,689. The Law School Transparency estimated debt-financed cost of attendance for three years is $243,230.

== Bar examination passage ==
In 2023, the overall bar examination passage rate for the law school’s first-time examination takers was 87.70%. The Ultimate Bar Pass Rate, which the ABA defines as the passage rate for graduates who sat for bar examinations within two years of graduating, was 98.16% for the class of 2021.

== Employment ==
According to BU Law's official 2019 ABA-required disclosures, 87.6% of the Class of 2017 obtained full-time, long-term, JD-required employment ten months after graduation. BU Law's Law School Transparency under-employment score is 11.3%, indicating the percentage of the Class of 2019 unemployed, pursuing an additional degree, or working in a non-professional, short-term, or part-time job ten months after graduation.

For new graduates, the self-reported median starting salary for the class of 2019 was $176,000 in the private sector, and $79,000 in the public sector. This ranked the school #9 on the US News list "Schools Where Salaries for Grads Most Outweigh the Debt". BU placed 68 graduates from the class of 2019 at NLJ 100 firms, earning it the number 15 slot on the National Journal's law school rankings for large law firm employment.

== Notable people ==
=== Faculty ===
- George Annas
- James Bessen
- James E. Fleming
- Tamar Frankel
- Wendy Gordon
- Keith Hylton
- Gary Lawson
- David Lyons
- Wendy Mariner
- Linda McClain
- Kevin Outterson
- Christopher T. Robertson
- Jay Wexler
- David H. Webber
- William G. Young

=== Former faculty ===
- Randy Barnett
- Janis M. Berry
- Melville M. Bigelow
- Danielle Citron
- Archibald Cox
- Edwin W. Hadley
- George Stillman Hillard
- Boyd B. Jones
- Rikki Klieman
- David A. Lowy
- Frank Parsons
- Arthur Holbrook Wellman
- Henry A. Wyman
