= Richard D. Freer =

American legal scholar (born 1953)

Academic background
- Education: University of California, San Diego (BA); University of California, Los Angeles (JD)

Academic work
- Discipline: Law
- Institutions: Emory University School of Law
- Main interests: Civil Procedure

Richard Freer (born 1953) is an American academic focusing on civil procedure and is the dean and Robert Howell Hall Professor of Law at Emory University School of Law in Atlanta, Georgia. He has written numerous articles and has published more than 11 books during his career. Freer is also a member of the Barbri staff and has lectured for Barbri for over thirty years.

== Education ==
Freer graduated in 1975 from the University of California, San Diego with highest honors and four intercollegiate athletic letters in both baseball and tennis. He graduated from UCLA School of Law in 1978. While at UCLA, he was elected to Order of the Coif, was a member of the UCLA Law Review, and graduated 5th in his class.

== Professional career ==
Upon graduation, he clerked first for Chief Judge Edward Schwartz of the United States District Court for the Southern District of California from 1978 to 1979, and then Judge Clement Haynsworth of the United States Court of Appeals for the Fourth Circuit from 1979 to 1980. After clerking, Freer joined the litigation group of the Los Angeles firm of Gibson, Dunn & Crutcher. He joined the Emory faculty in 1983 and has served as visiting professor at George Washington University and at Central European University in Budapest.
