= Wendy Gordon =

American lawyer

Wendy J. Gordon is an American lawyer who is currently the William Fairfield Warren Distinguished Professor at Boston University School of Law.
