= Charles A. Shanor =

American legal scholar

Charles A. Shanor is a professor of law at Emory University School of Law in Atlanta, Georgia.

Shanor attended Rice University, was a Rhodes Scholar, and received bachelor's and master's degrees from Oxford University. He received his Juris Doctor degree from the University of Virginia.

He served as General Counsel to the United States Equal Employment Opportunity Commission from June 1984 to March 1987. He was nominated to the position by then President Ronald Reagan.

Shanor from time-to-time offers expert testimony in court proceedings, and he has also testified before Congress regarding the EEOC.

He is the author of several textbooks and supplements including National Security and Military Law, American Constitutional Law: Structure and Reconstruction, and Military Law in a Nutshell.

On June 25 he was elected into the College of Labor and Employment Lawyers. Professor Shanor was inducted as a Fellow of the College September 13, 2008.
