= Aaron Kesselheim =

American physician, medical researcher, and attorney

- Born: Aaron Seth Kesselheim; Cherry Hill, New Jersey
- Education: Harvard University; University of Pennsylvania School of Medicine; University of Pennsylvania Law School; Harvard School of Public Health
- Spouse: Jennifer Cohn (m. 2005)
- Scientific career
- Fields: Health policy; Internal medicine
- Institutions: Harvard Medical School

Aaron Seth Kesselheim is an American physician, attorney, and medical researcher who serves as a professor of Medicine and member of the Center for Bioethics at Harvard Medical School. He is also a member of the Division of Pharmacoepidemiology and Pharmacoeconomics in the Department of Medicine at Brigham and Women’s Hospital, where he created and leads the Program On Regulation, Therapeutics, And Law (PORTAL). In 2020, he was inducted into the National Academy of Medicine.

== Education ==
Kesselheim received his A.B. summa cum laude from Harvard University in 1996, where he majored in history and science. He then received his M.D. from the University of Pennsylvania School of Medicine and his J.D. from the University of Pennsylvania Law School, both in 2002. He earned his M.P.H. from the Harvard School of Public Health in 2007.
