= Keith Hylton =

American Law Professor

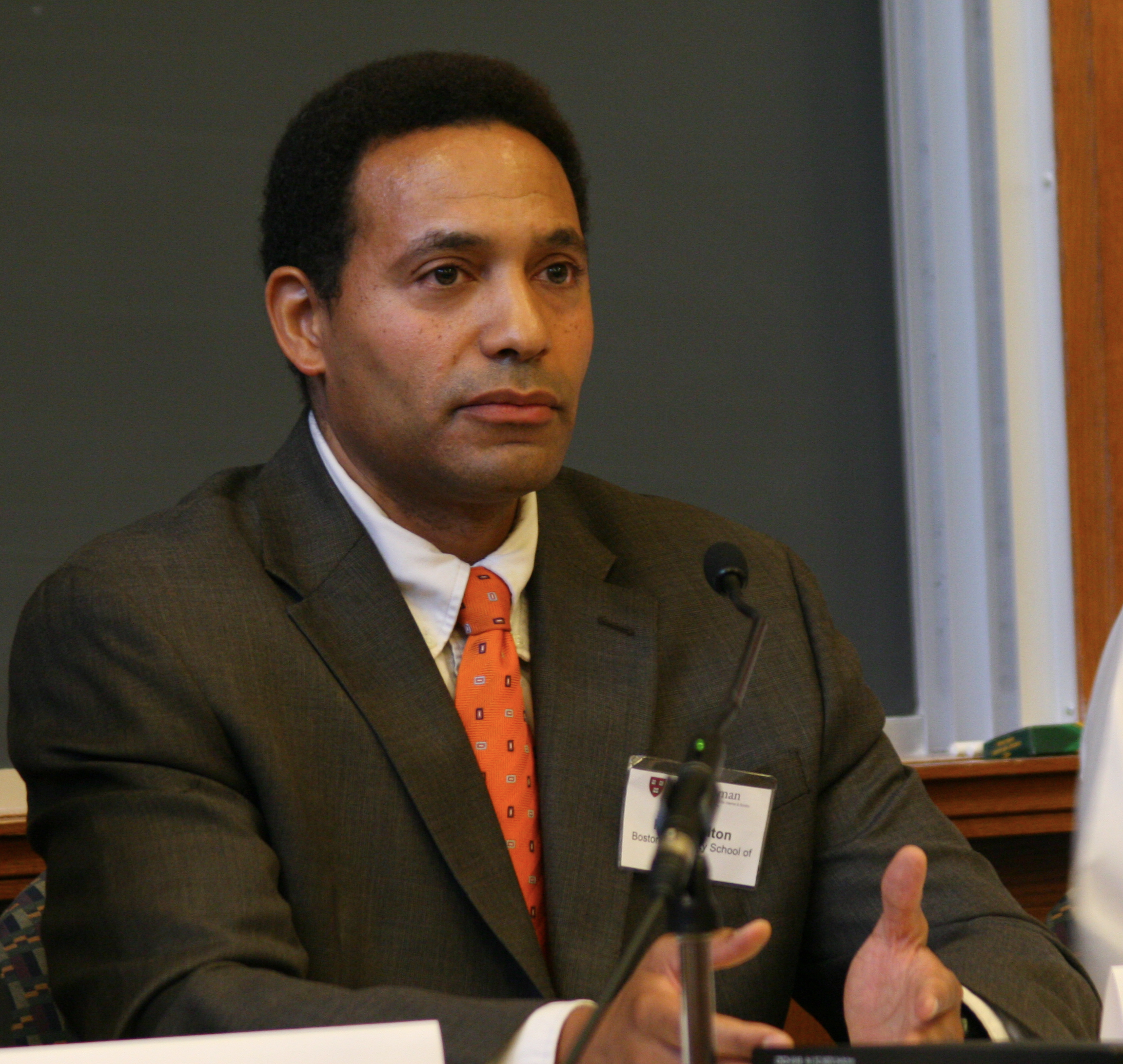
Keith Hylton

Keith N. Hylton is an American law professor, focusing in antitrust law, economics & law, employment law, intellectual property and torts, currently the William Fairfield Warren Distinguished Professor of Boston University at Boston University. A prolific scholar widely recognized for his work across a broad spectrum of topics in law and economics, Hylton has published five books and more than 100 articles in numerous law and economics journals. Currently, he serves as President of the American Law and Economics Association.

== Education ==
After graduating from Cass Technical High School in Detroit, Michigan, Hylton attended Harvard College for his undergraduate degree, where he won the Allyn Young Prize for the best undergraduate economics thesis, Massachusetts Institute of Technology for a PhD in Economics, and Harvard Law School for a JD.

== Selected books ==
Tort Law: A Modern Perspective (Cambridge University Press 2016).

Laws of Creation: Property Rights in the World of Ideas (Harvard University Press 2013). (with Ronald Cass)

Antitrust Law: Economic Theory and Common Law Evolution (Cambridge University Press 2003).
