= Matthew Sag =

Australian-American academic

Matthew Sag is an Australian-American academic and Jonas Robitscher Professor of Law in Artificial Intelligence, machine learning, and data science at Emory University School of Law. Sag is an expert in copyright law and intellectual property. He is a U.S. authority on the fair use doctrine in copyright law and its implications for researchers in the field of text data mining, machine learning and artificial intelligence.

Sag has published numerous works in journals such as Nature, and the law reviews of University of California Berkeley, Georgetown, Northwestern, Notre Dame, Vanderbilt, Iowa and William & Mary, among others. His research has been widely cited in academic works, court submissions, judicial opinions and government reports.

In July 2023, Sag testified before the U.S. Senate Committee on the Judiciary Subcommittee on Intellectual Property.

== Education ==
Sag graduated from the Australian National University in 1997 with a Bachelor of Arts and a Bachelors of Laws (with honors).

== Professional career ==
Sag was an associate to the honorable Justice Paul Finn of the Federal Court of Australia from 1997 to 1998.

Sag practiced law in Australia, the United Kingdom, and the United States from 1998 to 2004. He began has academic career as a Visiting Assistant Professor at Northwestern University School of Law in 2004.

Sag joined the faculty at DePaul University in 2006. He joined the faculty at Loyola University Chicago School of Law in 2011. He joined the faculty at Emory University School of Law in 2022. Sag is currently the Jonas Robitscher Professor of Law in Artificial Intelligence, Machine Learning, and Data Science at Emory University School of Law. Sag has served as a visiting professor at Melbourne University Law School, University of Virginia School of Law, and Northwestern University School of Law.

Sag is elected to the American Law Institute.

In July 2023, Sag testified before the U.S. Senate Judiciary Subcommittee on Intellectual Property in relation to artificial intelligence and copyright. The hearing focused on ensuring the United States remain competitive in the AI industry and examined the legality of using copyrighted material to train large language models without the consent of the artist. Sag stated that copyright does not, and should not, recognize computer systems as authors and discussed why training generative AI on copyrighted use is generally fair use.

== Personal life ==
Sag is dyslexic, a keen marathon runner, and has an Erdős number of 5.

== Selected publications ==
- We are the AI problem, Emory Law Journal Online [find link and details]
- Fairness and Fair Use in Generative AI, 92 Fordham Law Review 1887 (2024)
- Copyright Safety for Generative AI, 61 Houston Law Review 295–347 (2023)
- The New Legal Landscape for Text Mining and Machine Learning, 66 Journal of the Copyright Society of the U.S.A. 291–367 (2019)
- Taking Laughter Seriously at the Supreme Court, 72 Vanderbilt Law Review 1423–1496 (2019) (with Tonja Jacobi)
- The New Oral Argument: Justices as Advocates, 94 Notre Dame Law Review 1161–1254 (2019) (with Tonja Jacobi)
- Defense Against the Dark Arts of Copyright Trolling, 103 Iowa Law Review 571–661 (2018) (with Jake Haskell)
- Internet Safe Harbors and the Transformation of Copyright Law, 93 Notre Dame Law Review 499– 564 (2017)
- Promoting Innovation, 100 Iowa Law Review 2223–2247 (2015) (with Spencer Weber Waller)
- Copyright Trolling, An Empirical Study, 100 Iowa Law Review 1105–1146 (2015)
- League Structure & Stadium Rent Seeking – the Antitrust Role Reconsidered, 65 Florida Law Review 1–72 (2013) (with David Haddock and Tonja Jacobi)
- Digital Archives: Don’t Let Copyright Block Data Mining, 490 Nature 29–30 (October 4, 2012) (with Matthew Jockers and Jason Schultz)
- Orphan Works as Grist for the Data Mill, 27 Berkeley Technology Law Journal 1503–1550 (2012)
- An Information-Gathering Approach to Copyright Policy, 34 Cardozo Law Review 173 – 247 (2012) (with Peter DiCola)
- Predicting Fair Use, 73 Ohio State Law Journal 47– 91 (2012)
- The Pre-History of Fair Use, 76 Brooklyn Law Review 1371–1412 (2011)
- Copyright and Copy-Reliant Technology, 103 Northwestern University Law Review 1607–1682 (2009)
- Ideology and Exceptionalism in Intellectual Property – An Empirical Study 97 California Law Review 801 – 856 (2009) (with Tonja Jacobi & Maxim Sytch)
