= Emory Law Journal =

Law journal published at Emory University

- Discipline: Legal Studies
- Language: English
- Edited by: Justin Harvey

Publication details
- Former name: Journal of Public Law
- History: 1952–present
- Publisher: Emory University School of Law (United States)
- Frequency: 6/year
- Open access: Yes

Standard abbreviations
- Bluebook: Emory L.J.
- ISO 4: Emory Law J.

Indexing
- ISSN: 0094-4076
- LCCN: 74644258
- OCLC no.: 263104895

Links
- Journal homepage; Online Access

The Emory Law Journal is a student-run law review and the first journal to be sponsored by Emory University School of Law. The journal publishes six issues each year and features professional and student articles on a broad range of legal subjects.

== History and overview ==
The journal was founded in 1952 originally as the Journal of Public Law and later received its current title in 1974. The journal emphasized scholarship relating to public law fields until 1978, when the editorial board decided to retire its editorial policy focusing on the publication of articles relating to the political and sociological aspects of the law. Today the Emory Law Journal is editorially restricted only by the limits of legal scholarship and interest.

In 2014, the Emory Law Journal started publishing a digital companion to the journal, titled Emory Law Journal Online or ELJ Online. The ELJ Online serves as a forum for relevant, shorter scholarship rather than traditional essays and articles.

According to the 2025 journal rankings by Washington and Lee University School of Law, the Emory Law Journal is ranked 38th out of 1560 among the most cited law reviews.

== Randolph W. Thrower Symposium ==
The Emory Law Journal annually hosts the Randolph W. Thrower Symposium in the spring semester, an event which brings legal scholars from across the country together for the discussion of timely legal topics.

== See also ==
- List of law journals
