= Cathleen Kaveny =

American legal scholar and theologian

- Education: Princeton University Yale University
- Occupations: Professor of law and theology at Boston College

M. Cathleen Kaveny is an American legal scholar and theologian. She is the Darald and Juliet Libby Professor of Law and Theology at Boston College. She holds a joint appointment at both the Law School and Department of Theology at Boston College, the first person to hold a faculty appointment in two schools at that university.

== Education ==
Kaveny has an A.B. from Princeton University and an M.A., M.Phil., J.D., and Ph.D. from Yale University.

== Early career ==
She clerked for Judge John T. Noonan Jr. of the U.S. Court of Appeals for the Ninth Circuit and worked for a large firm in Boston.

== Academic career ==
Kaveny has published over forty articles and essays, in journals and books specializing in law, ethics, and medical ethics. She has served on several editor boards, including The American Journal of Jurisprudence, The Journal of Religious Ethics, the Journal of Law and Religion, and The Journal of the Society of Christian Ethics. She was the John P. Murphy Foundation Professor of Law and Professor of Theology at the University of Notre Dame from 2001 to 2013 where she sat on the advisory board of the Erasmus Institute, created in 1997 to encourage religiously-based intellectual traditions in contemporary scholarship. She became the Darald and Juliet Libby Professor of Law and Theology at Boston College, in Chestnut Hill, Massachusetts, in 2014.

On March 1, 2012, Kaveny was the guest on The Daily Show with Jon Stewart where she discussed the legal and theological issues surrounding the Catholic Church's position on contraception.

== Bibliography ==
- Law's Virtues: Fostering Autonomy and Solidarity in American Society (2012) (Note: Reviews of Law’s Virtues: David S. Caudill, J. Catholic Educ., doi:10.15365/joce.1701122013; William D. Dean, J. Religion, doi:10.1086/675519, JSTOR 10.1086/675519; John J. Fitzgerald, J. Law & Religion, doi:10.1017/jlr.2015.15; William P. George, Horizons, doi:10.1017/hor.2013.61; Kevin P. Lee, J. Law & Religion, doi:10.1017/jlr.2019.57; William Rehg, Ethics, doi:10.1086/670934, JSTOR 10.1086/670934; Eric E. Schnitger, J. Soc. Christian Ethics, JSTOR 24615172; Nicholas Townsend, Studies in Christian Ethics, doi:10.1177/0953946815585059c)
- A Culture of Engagement: Law, Religion, and Morality (2016) (Note: Reviews of A Culture of Engagement: Allen Calhoun, J. Soc. Christian Ethics, doi:10.1353/sce.2018.0048; M. Christian Green, Horizons, doi:10.1017/hor.2017.103; Jonathan Rothchild, J. Law & Religion, doi:10.1017/jlr.2019.56)
- Prophecy without Contempt: Religious Discourse in the Public Square (2016) (Note: Reviews of Prophecy without Contempt: Kyle David Bennett, Int. J. Public Theol., doi:10.1163/15697320-12341465; Mark Bratton, J. Contemp. Religion, doi:10.1080/13537903.2019.1585043; Nicholas Buck, Symposia, ; James F. Childress, J. Religious Ethics, doi:10.1111/jore.12211; John A. Coleman SJ, Theol. Studies, doi:10.1177/0040563916682640w; Roger Ferlo, Anglican Theol. Rev., ; Gerrit van Dyk, J. Relig. Theol. Inf, doi:10.1080/10477845.2017.1315558; Andrew Forsyth, Yale J. Law & Humanities, ; Richard A. Hibey, Amer. Cathol. Studies, ; John Kitch, Politics & Religion, doi:10.1017/S175504831600050X; Kyle Lambelet, J. Soc. Christian Ethics, doi:10.1353/sce.2017.0043, JSTOR 44987561; Julie Hanlon Rubio, Horizons, doi:10.1017/hor.2017.78; Mathew D. Scruggs, Religious Studies Rev., doi:10.1111/rsr.13675; Ted A. Smith, J. Law & Religion, doi:10.1017/jlr.2019.54)
- Ethics at the Edges of Law: Christian Moralists and American Legal Thought (2018) (Note: Reviews of Ethics at the Edges of Law: Matthew Lee Anderson, J. Church & State, doi:10.1093/jcs/csy048; Michael Bradley, Rev. in Relig. & Theol., doi:10.1111/rirt.13531; John Coughlin, Horizons, doi:10.1017/hor.2019.109; M. Christian Green, J. Law & Religion, doi:10.1017/jlr.2019.55; John R. Williams, Heythrop J., doi:10.1111/heyj.13292)
- "A companion, not a judge". Commonweal. 150 (1): 26–30. January 2023. (Note: Online version is titled "A defense of casuistry".)
