= Abdullahi Ahmed An-Na'im =

Sudanese-born Islamic scholar (born 1946)

- Born: 1946 (age 79–80)

Abdullahi Ahmed An-Na'im (Arabic: عبد الله أحمد النعيم; born in 1946) is a Sudanese-born Islamic scholar who lives in the United States and teaches at Emory University. He is the Charles Howard Candler Professor of Law at Emory University School of Law, associated professor in the Emory College of Arts and Sciences, and Senior Fellow of the Center for the Study of Law and Religion of Emory University.

An internationally recognized scholar of Islam and human rights and human rights in cross-cultural perspectives, Professor An-Na'im teaches courses in international law, comparative law, human rights, and Islamic law. His research interests include constitutionalism in Islamic and African countries, secularism, and Islam and politics. Professor An-Na'im directed the following research projects which focus on advocacy strategies for reform through internal cultural transformation:

- Women and Land in Africa
- Islamic Family Law
- Fellowship Program in Islam and Human Rights
- The Future of Sharia: Islam and the Secular State

Professor An-Na'im's current research projects include a study of Muslims and the secular state, and of human rights from state-centric to people-centered. He continues to further develop his theory advanced in his book Islam and the Secular State.

== Biography ==
Early life

An-Na'im was born in the Sudan, where he was greatly influenced by the Islamic reform movement of Mahmoud Mohamed Taha. He is a naturalized American citizen, but retains Sudanese citizenship.

Education

An-Na'im earned a PhD (Law) from University of Edinburgh (Scotland) in 1976; LLB (Honours) and Diploma in Criminology (MA) at University of Cambridge (England), 1973; LLB (Honours) at University of Khartoum (Sudan), 1970.

Career

In February 2009, An-Na'im received an Honorary Doctorate from the Université catholique de Louvain (UCL, Louvain-la-Neuve) and Katholieke Universiteit Leuven (K.U. Leuven, Leuven), Belgium. He also serves as Global Legal Scholar at the Law School, University of Warwick, UK (until November 2009); and Extraordinary Professor at the Centre for Human Rights, Faculty of Law, University of Pretoria (until November 2009).

== Publications ==
=== Author ===
- Decolonizing Human Rights (Cambridge University Press, 2021)
- What is an American Muslim? Embracing Faith and Citizenship (Oxford University Press, 2014)
- Muslims and Global Justice (University of Pennsylvania Press, 2010)
- Islam and Human Rights, Collected Essays in Law Series, edited by Mashood A. Baderin (Ashgate Publishing Ltd, 2010)
- Islam and the Secular State: Negotiating the Future of Shari'a (Harvard University Press, 2008). First published in Indonesian by Mizan publisher in 2007, Arabic by Merit publisher in 2010, and Chinese by China Social Science Press in 2017
- African Constitutionalism and the Role of Islam (University of Pennsylvania Press, 2006)
- Toward an Islamic Reformation: Civil Liberties, Human Rights and International Law (Syracuse University Press, 1990). First published in Arabic in 1994, Indonesian in 1995, Russian in 1999, and Persian in 2003
- Sudanese Criminal law: General Principles of Criminal Responsibility, in Arabic (Omdurman, Sudan: Huriya Press, 1985)

=== Editor ===
- Inter-religious Marriages among Muslims: Negotiating Religious and Social Identity in Family and Community (New Delhi, India: Global Media Publications, 2005)
- Human Rights under African Constitutions: Realizing the Promise for Ourselves, (Philadelphia, USA: University of Pennsylvania Press, 2002)
- Islamic Family Law in a Changing World: A Global Resource Book (London, UK: Zed Books, 2002)
- Cultural Transformation and Human Rights in Africa (London, UK: Zed Books, 2002)
- Proselytization and Communal Self-Determination in Africa (Maryknoll, USA: Orbis Books, 1999)
- Universal Rights, Local Remedies: Implementing Human Rights in the Legal Systems of Africa (London, UK: Interights, Afronet, GTZ, 1999)
- The Cultural Dimensions of Human Rights in the Arab World (Arabic) (Cairo, Egypt: Ibn Khaldoun Center, 1993)
- Human Rights in Cross-Cultural Perspectives: Quest for Consensus (Philadelphia, USA: University of Pennsylvania Press, 1992)

=== Co-editor ===
- With Ifi Amadiume: The Politics of Memory: Truth, Healing and Social Justice (London, UK: Zed Books, 2000)
- With J. D. Gort, H. Jansen, & H. M. Vroom: Human Rights and Religious Values: An Uneasy Relationship? (Grand Rapids, MI: William B. Eerdmans Publishing Company, 1995)
- With Francis Deng: Human Rights in Africa: Cross-Cultural Perspectives (Washington, DC: The Brookings Institution, 1990)

=== Translator ===
- Cry of the Owl by Francis Deng, into Arabic (Cairo, Egypt: Midlight, 1991)
- The Second Message of Islam by Ustadh Mahmoud Mohamed Taha, into English with Introduction (Syracuse, NY, USA: Syracuse University Press, 1987)

=== Foreword ===
- Foreword in Pranoto Iskandar, Hukum HAM Internasional, Cianjur: The Institute for Migrant Rights Press, 2010.
- Foreword in War on Error: Real Stories of American Muslims, University of Arkansas Press, 2007.
- Foreword in Radical Conflict: Essays on Violence, Intractability, and Communication, Lexington, 2016.

=== Selected articles and chapters ===
- “Oh, [Muslims] Believers: Be Just, That is Always Closer to True Piety,” Conversations on Justice from National, International, and Global Perspectives: Dialogues with Leading Thinkers,” Jean-Marc Coicaud and Lynette E. Sieger, editors, (Cambridge, UK: Cambridge University Press, 2019) pp. 79-100
- “The Postcolonial Fallacy of ‘Islamic’ Family Law,” Shazia Choudhry and Jonathan Herring, editors (Cambridge, UK: Cambridge University Press, 2019), pp. 254-279.
- “The Spirit of Laws is not Universal: Alternatives to the Enforcement Paradigm for Human Rights,” Tilburg Law Review21 (2016), pp. 255-274.
- “The Individual and Collective Self-Liberation Model of Ustadh Mahmoud Mohamed Taha,” in Akeel Bilgrami, editor, Beyond the Secular West (Columbia University Press, 2016), pp. 45-75.
- “Islamic Politics and the Neutral State: A Friendly Amendment to Rwals?” in Tom Bailey and Valentina Gentile, editors, Rwals and Relgion, (New York: Columbia University Press, 2015), pp. 242-265.
- “Complementary, Not Competing, Claims of Law and Religion: An Islamic Perspective,” Pepperdine Law Review, (2013), Vol. 39, pp. 1231-1255.
- “The Interdisciplinarity of Human Rights,” in Conor Gearty and Costas Douzinas, editors, The Cambridge Companion to Human Rights Law, (Cambridge, UK: Cambridge University Press, 2012), pp. 97-113.
- “Islam and Human Rights,” in John Witte and M. Christian Green, editors, Religion and Human Rights, (Oxford, UK: Oxford University Press, 2012), pp. 56-70.
- “Islam, Sharia and Democratic Transformation in the Arab World,” in Rebellion and Revolution in the Arab Region – From the Perspective of Peace Research Issue 1, Die Friedens-Warte. Journal of International Peace and Organization, (2012), Vol. 87, pp. “27-41.
- “Transcending Imperialism: Human Values and Global Citizenship,” The Tanner Lectures on Human Values, Suzan Young, editor, (Salt Lake City, UT, USA: University of Utah Press, 2011), Vol. 30, pp. 71-144.
- “Religious Norms and Family Law: Is it Legal or Normative Pluralism?” Emory International Law Review, (2011), Vol. 25:2, pp. 785-809.
- “Beyond dhimmihood: Citizenship and Human Rights,” in Robert W. Hefner, editor, The New Cambridge History of Islam, Muslims and Modernity: Culture and Society since 1800, (Cambridge, UK: Cambridge University Press, 2010), Vol. 6, pp. 314-334.
- “Islam and Secularism,” in Linell Cady and Elizabeth Shakman Hurd, editors, Comparative Secularisms in a Global Age, (New York, NY, USA:, Palgrave MacMillan, 2010), pp. 217-228.
