= American Society of Law, Medicine and Ethics =

The American Society of Law, Medicine and Ethics (ASLME) is a non-profit educational and professional organization. Based in Boston, Massachusetts, it is multidisciplinary in nature with members drawn from both the legal and medical professions. The society conducts research projects and conferences and publishes two journals, The Journal of Law, Medicine & Ethics and American Journal of Law & Medicine.

The society's roots go back to 1911 with the founding of the Massachusetts Society of Examining Physicians. For 70 years it was the only statewide organization in Massachusetts with programs that combined both medical and legal issues. In 1968 attorneys were admitted as non-voting members. The American Society of Law and Medicine was incorporated as its successor in 1972 with Elliot L. Sagall as its president. Sagall was a cardiologist who also co-taught a course with George Annas on law and medicine at Boston College Law School. In 1992 the society was renamed American Society of Law, Medicine and Ethics.

Past presidents of the society include the legal scholars Mary Anne Bobinski and Kathleen Boozang and the physicians John Lantos and Ronald Cranford.

== Research and education projects ==
- The Mayday Pain Project, begun in 1995 and funded by the Mayday Fund, focuses on the legal constraints on access to effective pain relief
- The DNA Fingerprinting and Civil Liberties Project, initiated in 2003 with funding from the National Institutes of Health, focuses on the legal and ethical aspects of DNA fingerprinting and data banks
