= Washington University Law Review =

- Language: English
- Edited by: Caleb Rogers

Publication details
- Former names: St. Louis Law Review; Washington University Law Quarterly
- History: 1915-present
- Publisher: Washington University School of Law (United States)
- Frequency: Bimonthly

Standard abbreviations
- Bluebook: Wash. U. L. Rev.
- ISO 4: Wash. Univ. Law Rev.

Indexing
- ISSN: 2166-7993 (print); 2166-8000 (web)
- LCCN: 2006245267
- OCLC no.: 71827741

Links
- Journal homepage

The Washington University Law Review (also referred to as WULR) is a bimonthly law review published by students at Washington University School of Law. As a generalist journal, it covers all legal topics.

WULR is ranked in the top 25 United States law journals by the University of Oregon.

== History ==
The Law Review was established as the St. Louis Law Review in 1915, retitled the Washington University Law Quarterly in 1936, and was most recently renamed in 2006.
