= American Journal of Law & Medicine =

- Discipline: Health law
- Language: English
- Edited by: Edward J. Hutchinson

Publication details
- History: 1975-present
- Publisher: Cambridge University Press
- Frequency: Quarterly
- Impact factor: 0.5 (2023)

Standard abbreviations
- Bluebook: Am. J.L. & Med.
- ISO 4: Am. J. Law Med.

Indexing
- ISSN: 0098-8588 (print); 2375-835X (web)

Links
- Journal homepage; Online access; Online archive

The American Journal of Law & Medicine is a quarterly peer-reviewed academic journal covering health law. It was established in 1975 and was published by SAGE Publishing till December 2020, in association with both Boston University School of Law and the American Society of Law, Medicine & Ethics. Starting January 2021, the journal is published by Cambridge University Press. The editor-in-chief is Edward J. Hutchinson (American Society of Law, Medicine & Ethics).

According to the Journal Citation Reports, the journal has a 2023 impact factor of 0.5.
