= The Journal of Law, Medicine & Ethics =

- Discipline: Medical ethics, medical law
- Language: English
- Edited by: Aaron S. Kesselheim

Publication details
- History: 1981–present
- Publisher: Cambridge University Press for the American Society of Law, Medicine and Ethics (United States)
- Frequency: Quarterly
- Impact factor: 2.1 (2022)

Standard abbreviations
- Bluebook: J.L. Med. & Ethics
- ISO 4: J. Law Med. Ethics

Indexing
- CODEN: JLAEEO
- ISSN: 1073-1105 (print); 1748-720X (web)
- LCCN: 93657473
- OCLC no.: 863246986

Links
- Journal homepage; Online access; Online archive

The Journal of Law, Medicine & Ethics is a quarterly peer-reviewed academic medical journal covering medical ethics and medical law. It was established in 1981 as Law, Medicine & Health Care, which itself was formed by the merger of two journals: Medicolegal News and Nursing Law & Ethics. The journal obtained its current name in 1993. It is published by Cambridge University Press in partnership with the American Society of Law, Medicine & Ethics. The editor-in-chief is Aaron S. Kesselheim. According to the Journal Citation Reports, the journal has a 2022 impact factor of 2.1.

== See also ==
- List of ethics journals
