= American Journal of Bioethics =

- Discipline: Bioethics, philosophy, health policy, health law, health economics, sociology of medicine
- Language: English
- Edited by: David Magnus

Publication details
- History: 1999–present
- Publisher: Taylor & Francis
- Frequency: Monthly
- Open access: Hybrid
- Impact factor: 20.8 (2024)

Standard abbreviations
- ISO 4: Am. J. Bioeth.

Indexing
- ISSN: 1526-5161 (print); 1536-0075 (web)
- LCCN: sn99009204
- OCLC no.: 42279301

Links
- Journal homepage; Current issue; List of issues

The American Journal of Bioethics (AJOB) is a monthly peer-reviewed academic journal published by Taylor & Francis, covering all aspects of bioethics. It publishes target articles, open peer commentaries, editorials, book reviews, and case studies and commentaries in clinical care and research ethics. The journal also publishes special issues that address timely ethical challenges. The editor-in-chief is David Magnus (Stanford University), who was also one of the journals founders.

The journal was established in 1999 by founding editor-in-chief Glenn McGee and David Magnus. It has produced independently managed journals on neuroscience and empirical bioethics as spin-offs.

== Bioethics Today ==
The journal is affiliated with bioethicstoday.org, also owned by Taylor & Francis, which publishes information on the latest journal publications, events, job opportunities, current news, and original blog content. The website is maintained by the editorial staff of the journal.

== Abstracting and indexing ==
The journal is abstracted and indexed in:

- Biological Abstracts
- BIOSIS Previews
- CINAHL
- CSA databases
- Current Contents/Life Sciences
- Current Contents/Social & Behavioral Sciences
- EMBiology
- Index Medicus/MEDLINE/PubMed
- ProQuest databases
- Science Citation Index
- Scopus
- Social Sciences Citation Index
- Social Service Review
- The Philosopher's Index

According to the Journal Citation Reports, the journal has a 2024 impact factor of 20.8, ranking it first out of 23 journals in the category "Medical Ethics", first out of 77 journals in the category "Ethics", first out of 68 journals in the category "Social Issues", and first out of 48 journals in the category "Social Sciences, Biomedical". The journal's 5 year impact factor is 14.7.

== See also ==
- List of bioethics journals
- List of ethics journals
