= UCLA Law Review =

- Discipline: Law
- Language: English
- Edited by: Grace Remington

Publication details
- History: 1953–present
- Publisher: UCLA School of Law (United States)
- Frequency: Bimonthly

Standard abbreviations
- Bluebook: UCLA L. Rev.
- ISO 4: UCLA Law Rev.

Indexing
- ISSN: 0041-5650 (print); 1943-1724 (web)
- LCCN: 59021081
- OCLC no.: 801841495

Links
- Journal homepage

The UCLA Law Review is a bimonthly law review established in 1953 and published by students of the UCLA School of Law, where it also sponsors an annual symposium.

Originally, UCLA Law proposed in 1950 that either Berkeley and UCLA should publish a joint law review or that all law schools in the state should jointly publish a law review. After Berkeley shot down both proposals, UCLA Law persuaded the Board of Regents in 1952 to provide a full subsidy for the launch of its own law review.

Membership is decided based on performance on a write-on competition. The editorial board is selected from the staff. Past editors have included federal judges Paul J. Watford, Sandra Segal Ikuta, and Kim McLane Wardlaw.

The UCLA Law Review ranks 10th in the nation among all legal law journals. Bryce Clayton of the University of Oregon noted that as of 2023, it ranks 16th per US News Peer Reputation score (averaged over 10 years), 7th per Washington and Lee Law Journal Ranking, and 15th per overall US News school ranking (averaged over 10 years).
