= Law and religion =

Interdisciplinary study

Law and religion is the interdisciplinary study of relationships between law, especially public law, and religion. Over a dozen scholarly organizations and committees focussing on law and religion were in place by 1983, and a scholarly quarterly, the Journal of Law and Religion, was first published that year. The Ecclesiastical Law Journal began publication in 1987. The Rutgers Journal of Law and Religion was founded in 1999. The Oxford Journal of Law and Religion was founded in England in 2012.

Many departments and centers for the subject have been created around the world during the last decades. For example, in 1982, Emory University established the Center for the Study of Law and Religion as part of the School of Law. The Center for the Study of Law and Religion offers a JD concentration and joint programs with the Candler School of Theology and the Laney Graduate Program. Emory's Center for the Study of Law and Religion edits three international book series (with Cambridge, Eerdmans and Brill) and edits the Journal of Law and Religion. In 2000, the Brigham Young University law school created the International Center for Law and Religion Studies, which also features an international mission. Brigham Young's annual symposium, which began in 1993, has brought to campus over 1000 scholars, human rights activists, judges from supreme courts, and government ministers dealing with religious affairs from more than 120 countries.

As of 2012, major law and religion organizations in the U.S. included 500 law professors, 450 political scientists, and specialists in numerous other fields such as history and religious studies. Between 1985 and 2010, the field saw the publication of some 750 books and 5000 scholarly articles, according to Emory Law Professor John Witte Jr.

== Research topics ==
Scholars in the field are not only focused on strictly legal issues about religious freedom or non-establishment but also on the study of religions as they are qualified through judicial discourses or legal understanding on religious phenomena. For example, The Oxford Journal of Law and Religion seeks to cover

social, legal and political issues involving the relationship between law and religion in society; comparative law perspectives on the relationship between religion and state institutions; developments regarding human and constitutional rights to freedom of religion or belief; considerations of the relationship between religious and secular legal systems; empirical work on the place of religion in society; and other salient areas where law and religion interact (e.g., theology, legal and political theory, legal history, philosophy, etc.).

Researchers study canon law, natural law, and state law, often in comparative perspective. They have explored themes in western history regarding Christianity and justice and mercy, rule and equity, discipline and love. Topics include marriage and the family, and human rights. Aside from Christianity, scholars have looked at connections between the Quran in the Muslim Middle East, Asian ancestral religions, occult altercations, pagan Rome, and any realm in which religious beliefs form the basis of or contradict governmental law. A recent literature has also begun examining how certain religious groups (Muslim, Jewish, and Catholic) engage with the American legal system as amicus curiae to advance their interests.

Within Christianity, studies range from textual analysis of early Christians' relationship with Jewish law, the effect of law on the Protestant Reformation, and contemporary issues like homosexual unions, the ordination of women to the diaconate and priesthood, and conscientious objection to war.

Studies have been published on secularization, in particular the issue of wearing religious symbols in public, such as headscarves that are banned in French schools, have received scholarly attention in the context of human rights and feminism. Other controversies about medical care which have been studied include, in the United States, religious exemptions for the vaccination of children and the legal rights of members of the Christian Science denomination who wish to deny medical care to their ill children in favor of faith healing.

There are secular laws that directly interact with religiosity, exemplified in the 1st Amendment of the U.S. Constitution.

== National studies ==
=== Thailand ===
In Thailand, the constitutional monarchy that was established in the 1930s integrated traditional Buddhist concepts of cosmic law and religion with modern methods of public administration and legal authority. The result was the formation of a unique civic religion based on the three-way formula of nation, religion, and kingship. This new tradition has evolved and provides a framework for both symbolic discourse as well as practical actions in modern Thai legal culture.

== Cross-denominational ==
The study of religion and law spans every civilization throughout every period in history. In the past, when religion was more prevalent in daily life, laws were often based explicitly on religion in places where religion was held to be the primary or sole source of morality. This can be seen with laws that governed the Ancient Greek and Roman societies based on pleasing the various gods they worshipped. Ancient Judeo-Christian societies established laws based on their canonical texts such as the Torah or Bible. In medieval Europe, the Catholic Church was heavily intertwined with the government.

The United States is classified as a secular society because of the laws established in the First Amendment prohibiting the establishment of a national religion while also allowing any religion to be freely practiced.

== Religious exemptions for medical treatments ==
=== Childhood vaccines ===
44 U.S. states allow religious exemptions for childhood vaccines. 5 states (California, Maine, Mississippi, New York, and West Virginia) allow medical exemptions only. The way religious exemptions can be granted varies by state. Some states have forms that can be signed whereas others require the parent/guardian to write a letter proclaiming 'bonafide religious belief' that prevents them from vaccinating their child. Some states, such as New York, have banned religious exemptions in response to outbreaks of diseases previously well-controlled by vaccination.

=== Refusal of blood transfusions by Jehovah's Witnesses ===
The Watch Tower Bible and Tract Society has historically opposed blood transfusions. Jehovah's Witnesses refuse blood transfusions and carry cards on their person to indicate such refusal. Historically, U.S. courts have generally ruled that Jehovah's Witnesses who refuse blood transfusions for themselves may not do so on behalf of their children. The first such case went to the Supreme Court in 1951. The Court ruled that:

- The child’s interests and those of the state outweigh parental rights to refuse medical treatment.
- Parental rights do not give parents life and death authority over their children.
- Parents do not have an absolute right to refuse medical treatment for their children based on their religious beliefs.

=== Other relevant court cases ===
==== Walker v. Supreme Court 1988 ====
Laurie Walker was charged with manslaughter after her four-year-old daughter Shauntay died of bacterial meningitis 17 days after symptoms presented. Walker called for the services of a Christian Science practitioner, but not a doctor. She was convicted by judges who cited a 1944 Supreme Court ruling that “parents may be free to become martyrs themselves. But it does not follow that they are free, in identical circumstances, to make martyrs of their children.”

== Secularism ==
Secularism is the concept of separating state institutions from religious organizations.

=== Canada ===
In Canada, secularism aims to protect individuals' rights to freedom of speech and freedom of religion. Therefore, any religion or belief they choose may be practiced without interference.

==== R. v. Big M Drug Mart Ltd. ====
The Big M Drug Mart case, R. v. Big M Drug Mart Ltd., is a notable example that sheds light on secularism in Canada.

In 1906, the Lord's Day Act was passed to establish a Sunday Sabbath marked by religious observance and business closure. In 1982, the Big M Drug Mart was charged with violating the Act by selling items on Sundays. During the litigation, constitutional questions were raised regarding the Act's compatibility with freedom of religion and conscience. The case also raised questions concerning its appropriateness under section 1 of the Canadian Charter of Rights and Freedoms. Regarding its consistency with the Parliament's criminal jurisdiction, it also raised concerns. The Lord's Day Act was declared unconstitutional by the Supreme Court because it breached section 2 of the Charter. The Act was unconstitutional because it had no real secular goal and was designed to encourage religious devotion. The Court's ruling represented the first time Charter law was completely overturned. It also assisted in the development of the "Oakes test," which stipulates that any restriction on Charter rights must be reasonable and backed up by evidence.

The Big M Drug Mart case is a potent illustration of Canadian secularism. This is because it exemplifies efforts to maintain religious freedom and the separation of Church and state. The case made clear the Lord's Day Act's conflicting religious and secular intentions. The Court gave individual rights and freedoms the highest priority over religious commandments by invalidating the Act.

== See also ==
- Religious law
- Religious studies
