= Duke Law Journal =

- Discipline: Legal studies
- Language: English
- Edited by: Gabriela Nagle Alverio

Publication details
- Former name: Duke Bar Journal
- History: 1951-present
- Publisher: Duke University School of Law (United States)
- Frequency: 8/year
- Open access: Yes
- Impact factor: 2.1 (2014)

Standard abbreviations
- Bluebook: Duke L.J.
- ISO 4: Duke Law J.

Indexing
- ISSN: 0012-7086 (print); 1939-9111 (web)
- LCCN: sf82007022
- JSTOR: 00127086
- OCLC no.: 1567016

Links
- Journal homepage; Online access; Online archive

The Duke Law Journal is a student-run law review and the premier legal periodical of Duke University School of Law. The journal publishes general-interest articles and student notes in eight issues each year.

== History and Overview ==
The journal was established in March 1951 as the Duke Bar Journal and obtained its current title in 1957. In 1969, the journal published its inaugural Administrative Law Symposium issue, a tradition that continues today.

Volume 1 of the Duke Bar Journal had two issues and 259 pages. In 1959, the journal grew to four issues and 649 pages, growing again in 1970 to six issues and 1263 pages. More recently, Volume 60 had just over 1900 pages in eight issues.

The Duke Law Journal is consistently ranked among the most cited law reviews according to the Washington and Lee University School of Law's rankings.

== Staff and selection of membership ==
The journal selects approximately 40 second-year law students for membership. This selection occurs through Duke Law's casenote competition. At the end of the first year, students interested in joining the journal submit a 14-page paper analyzing an assigned case, which current journal members grade. Of the group that submitted notes, the Duke Law Journal then selects one third of its members from those who have the highest first-year grade point average, one third whose GPA and note score were highest in combination, and the final third based on the remaining highest note scores.

Students who wish to join the Duke Law Journal after the casenote competition (i.e., in their third year) may do so by writing a note of publishable quality and submitting it through the "note-on" process. The journal has occasionally accepted one or two students per year in this manner.

== Administrative Law Symposium ==
The Duke Law Journal has hosted a yearly symposium on administrative law for more than 50 years, which is widely considered the premier administrative law event in the United States.

== Past Editors-in-chief ==
The following persons have been editors-in-chief:

- 2021-2022 Jennalee Beazley
- 2020-2021 Christian I. Bale
- 2019-2020 Farrah Bara
- 2018-2019 Samuel R. Howe
- 2017-2018 Patrick C. Bradley
- 2016-2017 Ace Factor
- 2015-2016 Jyoti Jindal
- 2014-2015 Bill O'Connell
- 2013-2014 Christopher Bryant
