= Elizabeth Kelly (disambiguation) =

Elizabeth Kelly (1921–2025) was an English actress.

Elizabeth Kelly may also refer to:

- Elizabeth Kelly (artist) (1877–1946), New Zealand artist
- Elizabeth J. Kelly, American statistician
- Liz Tilberis (1947–1999; née Elizabeth Kelly), British fashion magazine editor
- Betty Kelly (born 1944), American singer
- Liz Kelly (born 1951), British academic, abuse studies
- Lizzie Kelly (born 1993), British jockey
