= Clare McGlynn =

British law professor (born 1970)

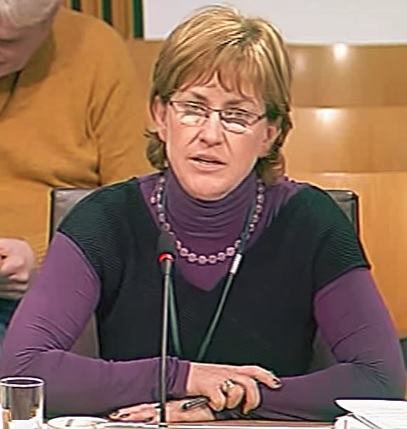
- McGlynn speaks before the Justice Committee of the Scottish Parliament in 2015
- Born: Clare Mary Smith McGlynn; 1970 (age 55–56); Kirkcaldy, Fife, Scotland

Academic background
- Education: Durham University
- Thesis: Controlling the conduct of company directors (1996)

Academic work
- Institutions: Durham University
- Main interests: Legal regulation of pornography, image-based sexual abuse (including ‘revenge pornography’) and sexual violence

Clare Mary Smith McGlynn (born 1970) is a Professor of Law at Durham University in the UK and leading expert on violence against women and girls and gender equality. She advises governments, civil society and social media platforms regarding online and image-based sexual abuse, and works closely with survivors to strengthen the law. In 2020, she was appointed King’s Counsel honoris causa in recognition of her role influencing law reform regarding image-based abuse and sexual violence. In 2024 she was appointed to the Judicial Appointments Commission for a three year term as Lay Commissioner. McGlynn has also served as a member of the UK Parliament's Independent Expert Panel.

McGlynn specialises in the legal regulation of pornography, image-based sexual abuse (formerly known as revenge pornography), cyberflashing, online abuse, violence against women, and gender equality in the legal profession. She was awarded an Honorary Doctorate from Lund University, Sweden, in 2018 in recognition of the international impact of her research on sexual violence and she is a Fellow of the Academy of Social Sciences. She is a member of the Council of Europe’s Committee of Experts on Combating Technology-Facilitated Violence against Women and Girls. Her active role in supporting women and girls led to her being named as an ‘outstanding’ advocate by Glamour magazine on International Women’s Day 2025.

She extensively contributes to national and international media and public debates, regularly being interviewed on the UK’s flagship political programme BBC Radio 4 Today, as well as BBC Woman’s Hour, breakfast TV, Channel 4 News, and all mainstream media. Her expert opinion is featured in many documentaries including BBC Panorama 'The Secret World of Trading Nudes’, the controversial Channel 4 documentary with Vicky Pattinson ‘My Deepfake Sex Tape’, German national TV’s ZDF documentary on deepfake porn and in Austria, the NZZ programme ‘Fake Porn, Real Victims’.

She has written op-eds for the Independent, Daily Express, the Irish Journal, the Huffington Post, and the New Statesman. Her commentary on criminalising ‘deepfake porn’ in The Conversation has been widely translated.

Her research and advocacy has been instrumental to the introduction of new laws tackling online and image-based sexual abuse. McGlynn played a key role in the campaign to criminalise creating sexually explicit deepfakes (‘deepfake porn’) in England and Wales, and was part of the coalition that secured a change in the Online Safety Act 2023 to require guidance on violence against women and girls. She was central to Rape Crisis London's campaign to 'close the loophole' that makes possession of rape pornography lawful in England and Wales. The campaign was successful, and an amendment to include rape in the definition of 'extreme pornography' was incorporated into the Criminal Justice and Courts Act 2015.

== Biography ==
McGlynn was born in Scotland, in 1970. At the age of 18 she moved to England to begin a degree in law at Durham University. After graduating in 1991, she went on to study at the College of Law, completing her Law Society Final Examinations in 1992. Following this she returned to Durham University as a teaching fellow. It was at Durham University that she completed her Master of Jurisprudence in 1996. Over the next four years she worked as a lecturer at the nearby University of Newcastle, before returning once again to Durham University as a reader in 1999. In 2004 she was promoted to Professor of Law, and remains highly active in academic research and teaching. She has served as deputy Head of the Law School and Deputy Head of the Faculty of Social Sciences and Health (Research), where she was responsible for diversity and equality, research strategy and the Research Excellence Framework. She was a member of the university's Taskforce on Sexual Violence and the university's governing body, University Council. McGlynn was also a member of the REF2021 Law Assessment Panel which reviews all UK legal research.

McGlynn's career also extends beyond academia. From 1993 to 1995 she trained as a solicitor with Herbert Smith Freehills, qualifying as a solicitor of the Supreme Court of England and Wales in 1995. In 2013 McGlynn played a key role in the success of a campaign to criminalise rape pornography in England and Wales. She was a trustee of Rape Crisis Tyneside and Northumberland from 2009 to 2019.

== Work on image-based sexual abuse ==
McGlynn's research (with Erika Rackley) developed the concept of image-based sexual abuse to describe all forms of the non-consensual creation and distribution of private sexual images, including 'revenge pornography' and upskirting. This term is now used internationally to describe these forms of abuse and McGlynn's research has shaped law reform campaigns across the world.

McGlynn’s research recommends criminalising the creation, solicitation and distribution of ‘deepfake pornography’. She has advised organisations such as HateAid on law reform options and recommends replacing the term ‘deepfake porn’ with ‘sexual digital forgeries’ which better reflects the nature and harms of this abuse.

In 2019, McGlynn published a report with colleagues "Shattering Lives and Myths" drawing on interviews with over 50 victims and stakeholders which was launched in Parliament at a roundtable chaired by Maria Miller MP and attended by many victims, criminal justice organisations, women's support groups, MPs and members of the House of Lords. Her work has played a key role in national debates, including in ITV News, and in legislative debates in the House of Lords. She has given evidence before the Scottish Justice Committee on proposed reforms in Scotland, recommending a new law focusing on the harms of victims, not the motives of the perpetrators, as well as giving presentations and evidence to policy-makers across Iceland, Ireland and Australia. In 2022, her evidence before the Northern Ireland Justice Committee influenced news laws on upskirting which go further than English law, supporting the campaign by two women teachers who were upskirted by a male school pupil to change the law.

McGlynn and her colleagues argue that 'revenge pornography' should be recognized as a form of sexual assault, that it should be seen as part of a pattern of sexual violence, along with other forms of image-based sexual abuse, and subject fully to the criminal law. In particular, she and her colleague criticized the legal loophole which meant that upskirting was not fully covered by the criminal law in England and Wales.

In November 2019, she was invited to South Korea to share international best practice in supporting victims of image-based sexual abuse and she has worked with Facebook, TikTok and Google to support their policies on non-consensual intimate images.

=== Cyberflashing ===
McGlynn’s research was influential in the adoption of the new criminal offence of cyberflashing – sending penis images to someone without their consent. She gave evidence before the UK Parliament to recommend changes to the Online Safety Bill which introduced the new offence. Her book with Kelly Johnson Cyberflashing: recognising harms, reforming laws was published in 2021 and is the first comprehensive study of the nature, harms and prevalence of cyberflashing. It identifies the gaps in the criminal laws of a range of countries and makes recommendations for reform. McGlynn regularly speaks to the media about cyberflashing, as well as supporting the campaign by dating app Bumble to raise awareness and change the law. Her testimony before the Northern Ireland Assembly led Justice Minister Naomi Long to introduce a cyberflashing offence in Northern Ireland.

=== Sexually violent pornography ===
McGlynn and colleagues published one of the largest studies to date of online porn finding that 1 in 8 titles on mainstream pornography websites described sexual violence. This research featured in the New York Times article by award-winning journalist Nick Kristof which directly led to PayPal removing its services from XVideos.

This research has formed the foundation for many legislative reforms and policy campaigns. It was cited in the English Children’s Commissioner’s research report on pornography and young people and cited in a report from the United Nations Special Rapporteur on VAWG. It has been cited before select committees of the Canadian Parliament and the UK Parliament, as well as in the first report from the House of Lords Communications and Digital Committee on free speech. It has been used in the submissions of civil society organisations to government consultations in Australia by Collective Shout and the UK by the End Violence Against Women coalition. It is influencing how the EU regulates the largest porn platforms and social media.

It was a key piece of evidence used by Baroness Benjamin and Baroness Jenkin of Kennington during the passage of the Online Safety Act to justify restrictions on pornography as well as being included in briefings by Barnardos.

== Influence on changes to pornography law ==
=== Incest porn ===
McGlynn’s research recommends strengthening the extreme pornography law to cover incest porn. She expands on this in her blog in The Conversation.

=== Criminalising rape pornography ===
Possession of "extreme pornography" was made illegal in England and Wales under Section 63 of the Criminal Justice and Immigration Act 2008. However, the definition of extreme pornography within this Act does not include depictions of rape. McGlynn and her colleague Erika Rackley argued that criminal sanctions against rape pornography can be justified on the basis of the cultural harm of the material.

In 2013, McGlynn and Rackley played an instrumental role in the campaign to introduce an amendment that would make possession of rape pornography illegal in England and Wales. The campaign was spearheaded by Rape Crisis South London and was supported by over 100 academics and women's groups. The campaign was successful, with Prime Minister David Cameron announcing in July 2013 that the law would be amended to make possession of rape porn illegal. McGlynn and Rackley wrote of their support for these reforms, whilst also recommending further clarifications to prevent unwanted consequences, such as the criminalisation of consensual BDSM activity. The change to the law was incorporated in the Criminal Justice and Courts Act 2015 which updated the definition of extreme pornography to involve porn which depicts acts of rape in an explicit and realistic manner. Parliament's Joint Committee on Human Rights reviewed the bill and endorsed McGlynn and Rackley's argument that cultural harm provides a strong justification for criminal sanctions. The committee also endorsed their view that the extreme pornography laws are human rights enhancing. The law was passed and it became illegal to possess pornography which shows acts of rape.

Her 2019 research published in the Journal of Criminal Law with Dr Hannah Bows found that most prosecutions under the extreme pornography legislation are for possession of bestiality images.

==== Scotland ====
McGlynn and Rackley informed the debate on rape and extreme pornography in Scotland. Their research supported Rape Crisis Scotland's campaign to include depictions of rape in the definition of extreme pornography, and their argument for cultural harm was discussed in the Scottish media. McGlynn and Rackley's argument for including rape in the definition of extreme pornography was endorsed by the Scottish Parliament's Justice Committee. The new legislation was introduced in section 42 of the Criminal Justice and Licensing (Scotland) Act 2010.

== Sexual history evidence in rape trials ==
McGlynn’s work on the use of sexual history evidence in rape trials has influenced policy reform and public debates. In 2017, she undertook a comprehensive review of this area of law, particularly examining the controversial Ched Evans case where the complainant's sexual activity with men other than the defendant was allowed at trial.

== Restorative Justice ==
=== Restorative justice and sexual violence ===
McGlynn and her colleagues Nicole Westmarland and Nikki Godden published the UK's first evaluation of the use of restorative justice in a case of sexual violence. Restorative justice conferences involve a victim and perpetrator meeting, along with a trained facilitator, to discuss the impact of the perpetrator's crimes. McGlynn and her colleagues interviewed the people involved in the conference, and concluded that restorative justice could be beneficial for victim survivors of sexual violence, but only if he or she is given the highest level of support prior to and throughout the process.

McGlynn and her colleagues have published further academic research on the subject, created a research briefing, and shared their work at conferences and workshops across the UK, with audiences comprising survivors, restorative justice practitioners, lawyers and policy-makers. This series of work focusses on the failings of the conventional criminal justice system and on the matter of whether restorative justice may have a corresponding role to play. McGlynn has given evidence on using restorative justice as part of the Justice Select Committee's inquiry into Restorative Justice. Together with her colleague, Nicole Westmarland, McGlynn has also submitted evidence to the UK Parliament's Justice Committee inquiry into Restorative Justice.

McGlynn and colleagues have also investigated the use of restorative justice in cases of domestic abuse. Similarly, in a study published in the British Journal of Criminology they found police using ‘out of court settlements’ in many domestic abuse cases, against police best practice guidance. A research policy briefing on this research is available here.

=== Sentencing and sexual offences ===
In 2011, Kenneth Clarke, then Minister for Justice, proposed increasing the sentencing discount awarded to defendants who plead guilty to a maximum of 50%. Public debate on this idea was impossible due to his comments made at the time of the announcement about some rapes being more serious than others. However, McGlynn has argued that while he was wrong on distinguishing between rapes, he was right to start a debate on sentencing discounts for very early guilty pleas. McGlynn argues that early guilty pleas may save some victims the trauma of pursuing a case through to court.

== Work on diversity in the legal profession ==
In 2024 McGlynn was appointed by His Majesty the King to the Judicial Appointments Commission. Established by the Constitutional Reform Act 2005, the Judicial Appointments Commission plays a major constitutional role in appointing an independent and diverse judiciary. This appointment reflects Professor McGlynn’s long-standing commitment to encouraging greater equality and diversity in the law and legal profession and follows her appointment as an Honorary KC (King’s Counsel).

=== The Woman Lawyer ===
Professor McGlynn is a leading advocate of the need to improve equality and women’s representation in the legal profession. Her first book The Woman Lawyer: Making the difference was published in 1998. As the first book-length study on the representation of women in the UK legal profession, it became a key reference point in debates surrounding diversity in legal contexts. In the book, McGlynn chronicles women's experiences throughout the legal profession, from law school to the judiciary. She combines her own empirical research and statistics with personal testimonies from women legal academics, lawyers and judges. These personal testimonies include contributions from Baroness Helena Kennedy, and Baroness Brenda Hale, who was the first woman on the Supreme Court. McGlynn's overarching theme is the need for reform within the legal profession; to introduce greater diversity and to challenge a culture in which women's abilities and achievements are marginalised.

=== Women legal academics ===
In the late 1990s, McGlynn carried out the first survey into the representation of women legal academics. Whilst it had already been established that women academics in various departments faced financial disadvantage and indirect discrimination, the representation of women academics in law schools remained unknown. The survey found that only 14% of law professors were women, and only 2 in 5 law schools had any women professors at all. In her paper about the findings, McGlynn discusses the impact of this under-representation of women upon the education of law students. She expands upon this in her article for the Times Higher Education Supplement, in which she states that popular culture often equates the law with men and 'masculine' attributes. This view is perpetuated by the predominance of male lawyers in senior positions. Stereotypes which suggest that women are less objective or neutral than men can harm women's prospects in the legal profession, and the lack of women lawyers in higher positions can enforce these perceptions.

== See also ==
- Nicole Westmarland
- Rape Crisis England and Wales
- Durham Law School
