= Maddy Coy =

British academic and women's rights activist

Academic work
- Institutions: London Metropolitan University
- Notable works: Prostitution, Harm and Gender Inequality: Theory, Research and Policy
- Website: London Metropolitan University

Maddy Coy is the deputy director of the Child and Woman Abuse Studies Unit (CWASU), London Metropolitan University and has collaborated with the End Violence Against Women Coalition (EVAW).

== Career ==
Prior to becoming a researcher, Coy worked for several years with sexually exploited girls and women. She has published a number of articles and book chapters on the sex industry, including links between local authority care and sexual exploitation, women's experiences of selling sex and men's motivations for buying sex. More recently Coy has focused on developing a gendered analysis of sexualised popular culture, including how this might be addressed in popular approaches and everyday practice with young people.

== Bibliography ==
=== Books ===
- Coy, Maddy (2012). Prostitution, harm and gender inequality: theory, research and policy. Farnham, Surrey, England Burlington, Vermont: Ashgate. ISBN 9781409405450.

=== Chapters in books ===
- Coy, Maddy (2012), "Introduction: Prostitution, harm and gender inequality", in Coy, Maddy (ed.), Prostitution, harm and gender inequality: theory, research and policy, Farnham, Surrey, England Burlington, Vermont: Ashgate, pp. 1–12, ISBN 9781409405450.
- Coy, Maddy (2012), "'I am a person too': women's accounts and images about body and self in prostitution", in Coy, Maddy (ed.), Prostitution, harm and gender inequality: theory, research and policy, Farnham, Surrey, England Burlington, Vermont: Ashgate, pp. 103–120, ISBN 9781409405450.
- Coy, Maddy; Kelly, Liz; Horvath, Miranda A.H. (2012), "Troubling notions of male entitlement: men consuming, boasting and confessing about paying for sex", in Coy, Maddy (ed.), Prostitution, harm and gender inequality: theory, research and policy, Farnham, Surrey, England Burlington, Vermont: Ashgate, pp. 121–140, ISBN 9781409405450.
- Coy, Maddy; Wakeling, Josephine; Garner, Maria (2012), "Selling sex sells: representations of prostitution and the sex industry in sexualised popular culture as symbolic violence", in Coy, Maddy (ed.), Prostitution, harm and gender inequality: theory, research and policy, Farnham, Surrey, England Burlington, Vermont: Ashgate, pp. 181–198, ISBN 9781409405450.
- Coy, Maddy (2012), "This body which is not mine: the notion of the habit body, prostitution and (dis)embodiment", in Gonzalez-Arnal, Stella; Jagger, Gill; Lennon, Kathleen (eds.), Embodied selves, New York: Palgrave Macmillan, pp. 101–118, ISBN 9781137283696.
- Coy, Maddy (2013), "Children, childhood and sexualised popular culture", in Wild, Jim (ed.), Exploiting childhood: how fast food, material obsession and porn culture are creating new forms of child abuse, London: Jessica Kingsley Publishers, pp. 149–163, ISBN 9780857007421.
- Coy, Maddy; Thiara, Ravi K. (2014), "'Boys think girls are toys': sexual exploitation and young people", in Ellis, Jane; Thiara, Ravi K. (eds.), Preventing violence against women and girls: educational work with children and young people, Bristol, UK Chicago, Illinois, USA: Policy Press, pp. 181–205, ISBN 9781447307310.
- Coy, Maddy; Kelly, Liz; Dustin, Holly (2015), "A feminist "epistemic community" reshaping public policy: a case study of the End Violence Against Women Coalition", in Johnson, Holly; Fisher, Bonnie S.; Jaquier, Véronique (eds.), Critical issues on violence against women: international perspectives and promising strategies, London: Routledge, pp. 244–257, ISBN 9781135006037.

=== Journal articles ===
- Coy, Maddy (December 2006). "This morning I'm a researcher, this afternoon I'm an outreach worker: ethical dilemmas in practitioner research". International Journal of Social Research Methodology. 9 (5): 419–431. doi:10.1080/13645570601076785. S2CID 143319993.
- Coy, Maddy (October 2008). "Young women, local authority care and selling sex: findings from research". The British Journal of Social Work. 38 (7): 1408–1424. doi:10.1093/bjsw/bcm049. S2CID 59016578.
- Coy, Maddy (April 2009). "This body which is not mine: the notion of the habit body, prostitution and dis(embodiment)". Feminist Theory. 10 (1): 61–75. doi:10.1177/1464700108100392. S2CID 144140391.
- Coy, Maddy (July 2009). "'Moved around like bags of rubbish nobody wants': how multiple placement moves can make young women vulnerable to sexual exploitation". Child Abuse Review. 18 (4): 254–266. doi:10.1002/car.1064.
- Coy, Maddy (November 2009). "Milkshakes, lady lumps and growing up to want boobies: how the sexualisation of popular culture limits girls' horizons". Child Abuse Review. 18 (6): 372–383. doi:10.1002/car.1094.
- Coy, Maddy; Horvath, Miranda A.H. (February 2011). "Lads' mags, young men's attitudes towards women and acceptance of myths about sexual aggression" (PDF). Feminism & Psychology. 21 (1): 144–150. doi:10.1177/0959353509359145. S2CID 73579596. Archived from the original (PDF) on 20 December 2022. Pdf. First published online 21 October 2010.
- Coy, Maddy (November 2010). "A brave new world: the strip club ban in Iceland and meanings for gender equality (views, events, and debates)". Gender & Development. 18 (3). Liz Cooke (editor): 539–553. doi:10.1080/13552074.2010.521994. S2CID 145065277.
- Coy, Maddy; Garner, Maria (November 2010). "Glamour modelling and the marketing of self-sexualization: critical reflections". International Journal of Cultural Studies. 13 (6): 657–675. doi:10.1177/1367877910376576. S2CID 145230875.
- Coy, Maddy; Kelly, Liz; Bowstead, Janet; Foord, Jo (March 2011). "Roads to nowhere? Mapping specialised violence against women services". Violence Against Women. 17 (3): 404–425. doi:10.1177/1077801211398637. PMID 26086982. S2CID 30738830.
- Coy, Maddy; Garner, Maria; Wakeling, Josephine (September 2011). "Selling sex sells: representations of prostitution and the sex industry in sexualised popular culture as symbolic violence". Women's Studies International Forum. 34 (5): 441–448. doi:10.1016/j.wsif.2011.05.008.
- Coy, Maddy; Garner, Maria (May 2012). "Definitions, discourses and dilemmas: policy and academic engagement with the sexualisation of popular culture". Gender and Education. 24 (3): 285–301. doi:10.1080/09540253.2012.667793. S2CID 145311311.
- Coy, Maddy; Scott, Emma; Tweedale, Ruth; Perks, Katherine (January 2015). "'It's like going through the abuse again': domestic violence and women and children's (un)safety in private law contact proceedings". Journal of Social Welfare and Family Law. 37 (1): 53–69. doi:10.1080/09649069.2015.1004863. S2CID 144158549.

=== Papers ===
==== For the CWASU ====
- Coy, Maddy; Kelly, Liz; Horvarth, Miranda (2007). 'It's just like going to the supermarket': men buying sex in East London: report for Safe Exit Tower Hamlets. London: Child and Woman Abuse Studies Unit (CWASU), London Metropolitan University for Rape Crisis Network Europe. ISBN 9780954480356. Pdf.
- Coy, Maddy; Kelly, Liz; Lee, Kerry; Roach, Colleen (July 2010). A missing link? An exploratory study of the connections between non-consensual sex and teenage pregnancy. London: Child and Woman Abuse Studies Unit (CWASU), London Metropolitan University. Archived from the original on 1 October 2015.
- Coy, Maddy; Kelly, Liz; Thiara, Ravi K.; Phillips, Ruth (2011). Into the foreground: an evaluation of the Jacana Parenting Programme. London: Child and Woman Abuse Studies Unit (CWASU), London Metropolitan University. Pdf.
- Coy, Maddy; Kelly, Liz; Thiara, Ravi K. (May 2011). Boys think girls are toys?: An evaluation of the NIA Project Prevention Programme on sexual exploitation. London: Child and Woman Abuse Studies Unit (CWASU), London Metropolitan University. Archived from the original on 1 October 2015. Pdf.
- Coy, Maddy; Perks, Katherine; Scott, Emma; Tweedale, Ruth (October 2012). Picking up the pieces: domestic violence and child contact. London: Rights of Women / Child and Woman Abuse Studies Unit (CWASU), London Metropolitan University. Pdf.
- Coy, Maddy; Kelly, Liz; Elvines, Fiona; Garner, Maria; Kanyeredzi, Ava (November 2013). "Sex without consent, I suppose that is rape": How young people in England understand sexual consent. London: Child and Woman Abuse Studies Unit (CWASU), London Metropolitan University. Archived from the original on 2 October 2015. Pdf. A report commissioned for the Office of the Children's Commissioner's Inquiry into Child Sexual Exploitation in Gangs and Groups.

==== For EVAW ====
- Coy, Maddy; Kelly, Liz; Foord, Jo (2007). Map of gaps: the postcode lottery of violence against women support services. London: End Violence Against Women. Archived from the original on 2 October 2015. ISBN 9780954480363 Pdf.
- Coy, Maddy; Kelly, Liz; Lovett, Jo (2008). Realising rights, fulfilling obligations: a template for an integrated strategy on violence against women for the UK. London: End Violence Against Women. Archived from the original on 4 March 2016. ISBN 9780955860928 Pdf.
