= Ellen Malos =

Australian-British scholar and activist (1937–2023)

- a doctorate in 2006
- Born: Ellen Scarlett; 21 November 1937; Ballarat, Australia
- Died: 22 August 2023 (aged 85); Bristol, England
- Education: Melbourne University
- Occupations: Teacher, academic
- Known for: Key figure in Bristol's Women's Liberation Movement
- Spouse: John Malos

Ellen Malos (née Scarlett, 21 November 1937 – 22 August 2023) was an Australian-British scholar and activist associated with Bristol Women's Aid, and a key figure in Bristol's Women's Liberation Movement.

== Early life and career ==
Ellen Scarlett was born in Ballarat, Victoria, Australia, on 21 November 1937. She was the first of five children. Her father was a longtime socialist, glazier and decorator, and her mother had made knitwear. At primary and Sunday school, she discovered a love of books.

Malos committed to teach in order to obtain a scholarship. She studied English and history at Melbourne University. She wrote a prize-winning thesis about the novelist Patrick White. She had to take up supply teaching as she was discriminated against because she was married. Her husband lost his job because he was a socialist. She studied for a master's degree and he completed his doctorate.

In 1962, she came to the UK with her husband and two-year-old son. She started a doctorate but had to abandon it as her supervisor that it unbelievable that a woman would try and get a Ph.D. while she had a child to care for. In 1969, she was living in Bristol when the first women's group was formed. In 1973, she gave over the basement of her house in Bristol to become the city's first women's centre.

The British Library have an oral history recording from her. She recalled how in 1971 a man who spoke at a Women's Liberation Movement meeting of "fighting for Women's Liberation all my life", while condemning lesbians, was dragged off the platform.

In 1990, Gill Hague and Ellen Malos founded a Violence Against Women Research Group. This would become the Centre for Gender and Violence Research at the University of Bristol. In 2019, Professor Hague was appointed a CBE for her contribution to combating violence against women.

In 2007, Next Link, a British domestic abuse support service, named their Women's Safe House "Ellen Malos House" to record her contribution.

The National Lottery funded "Feminist Archive South" to hire a part-time archivist to catalogue Malos's archives. Her archives, which cover an important period of Bristol Women's history, are now part of the Special Collections at the University of Bristol.

== Personal life and death ==
In 1958, she married fellow socialist John Malos, an Australian of Greek heritage. He died in 1995. Ellen Malos died at home on 22 August 2023, at the age of 85.

== Publications ==
- Malos, Ellen, ed. (1980). The Politics of Housework. Allison & Busby.
- Bullard, Emma; Ellen Malos; R A Parker (1991). Custodianship : caring for other people's children. HMSO.
- Hague, Gill; Ellen Malos; Wendy Dear (1996). Multi-agency work and domestic violence: a national study of inter-agency initiatives. Policy Press.
- Mullender, Audrey; Thangam Debbonaire; Liz Kelly; Gill Hague; Ellen Malos (May 1998). "Working with children in women's refuges". Child & Family Social Work. 3 (2): 87–98. doi:10.1046/j.1365-2206.1998.00074.x.
- Mullender, Audrey; Liz Kelly; Linda Regan; Gill Hague; Umme Imam; Ellen Malos (2002). Children's Perspectives on Domestic Violence. London: SAGE. ISBN 9780761971061.
- Skinner, Tina; Marianne Hester; Ellen Malos, eds. (11 January 2013). Researching Gender Violence. Routledge.
