= Cathy Zimmerman =

Social scientist and academic

- Born: Cathy Lynn Zimmerman
- Education: London School of Hygiene and Tropical Medicine; University of Paris
- Scientific career
- Fields: Public health
- Workplaces: London School of Hygiene and Tropical Medicine
- Thesis: The Health of Trafficked Women in Europe : Conceptual, Qualitative and Quantitative Findings (2007)
- Doctoral advisor: Charlotte Watts
- Website: www.lshtm.ac.uk/aboutus/people/zimmerman.cathy

Cathy Lynn Zimmerman is a social scientist and professor at the London School of Hygiene and Tropical Medicine (LSHTM). She founded the LSHTM Gender Violence & Health Centre. Her research investigates migration, violence and health.

== Early life and education ==
Zimmerman completed her undergraduate studies at UCLA. She moved to the London School of Hygiene and Tropical Medicine for graduate research. From 1993 to 1998, Zimmerman worked in Cambodia, building the first non-governmental organisation that focussed on eliminating domestic violence. Her PhD evaluated the health of trafficked women in Europe and was supervised by Charlotte Watts.

== Research and career ==
Zimmerman is a social scientist who studies human health in migration, violence and health. She worked with Charlotte Watts and Heidi Stöckl to create the Gender Violence and Health Centre. In the early days, they focussed on intervention research. With a randomised control trial, they showed that by empowering and supporting women, and by giving them livelihood options, they more than halved their experiences of violence. In particular, Zimmerman focussed on human trafficking and gender based violence.

Between 2000 and 2003, Zimmerman led a qualitative study on women's trafficking in the European Union. She followed this up with an investigation into over 200 women who had been forced into sex work through trafficking. These studies are the largest studies on human trafficking. She found that these women were injured and in pain, with almost 60% experiencing PTSD when they entered post-trafficking services. In an attempt to support the mental health of women who had been trafficked, Zimmerman worked with Amnesty International to provide more compassionate care to people in their "recovery period". Specifically, she created policies supporting people who had been trafficked, giving them up to 90 days to cooperate with criminal investigations. In the United Kingdom, the Home Office extended the reflection time to 45 days.

Zimmerman led a study into child domestic workers, looking to design new interventions to support young people involved in domestic work. She developed a way to measure child domestic work, and a framework for domestic work interventions. She worked with Department for International Development on the South Asia Work in Freedom Transnational (SWIFT) investigation, which ran alongside the International Labour Organization Work in Freedom programme.

=== Selected publications ===
- Charlotte Watts; Cathy Zimmerman (6 April 2002). "Violence against women: global scope and magnitude". The Lancet. 359 (9313): 1232–7. doi:10.1016/s0140-6736(02)08221-1. ISSN 0140-6736. PMID 11955557. Wikidata Q28214797.
- Cathy Zimmerman; Ligia Kiss; Mazeda Hossain (24 May 2011). "Migration and health: a framework for 21st century policy-making". PLOS Medicine. 8 (5) e1001034. doi:10.1371/journal.pmed.1001034. ISSN 1549-1277. PMC 3101201. PMID 21629681. Wikidata Q33918195.
- Cathy Zimmerman; Mazeda Hossain; Charlotte Watts (30 June 2011). "Human trafficking and health: a conceptual model to inform policy, intervention and research". Social Science & Medicine. 73 (2): 327–335. doi:10.1016/j.socscimed.2011.05.028. ISSN 0277-9536. PMID 21723653. Wikidata Q39632291.
