= Emma Katz =

UK-based domestic violence researcher

Emma Katz is a UK-based domestic violence researcher. Katz has contributed to policy and popular cultural discussion on coercive control, in particular in the UK, the United States, and Australia.

== Policy ==
Year	Body/jurisdiction		Document	Cited contribution(s)	
2016	(Victoria (state))	Parliament of Victoria	Royal Commission into Family Violence, Volume II: Report and Recommendations	Katz 2014	Concept of mothers and children as potential "promoters" of each other's recoveries from domestic violence.
2016	(United Kingdom)	HM Government, Department for Education	Pathways to Harm, Pathways to Protection: A Triennial Analysis of Serious Case Reviews 2011 to 2014	Katz 2016a	Concept of coercive control as ongoing as opposed to incident-based.
2017	(Australia)	Australian Government, Department of Social Services	Fathers Who Use Violence: Options for Safe Practice Where There Is Ongoing Contact With Children	Katz 2016a	Evidence that men who use "tactics of abuse" against their partners may also use the same tactics against their children.
2019	(Wales)	Welsh Parliament	Briefing submitted by Children in Wales, NSPCC Wales and Welsh Women's Aid to cross-party group on Children and Young People / Violence against Women and Children	Katz 2016b	Definition of the impacts of coercive control on children.
2020		Northern Ireland Assembly	Briefing submitted by NSPCC Northern Ireland in response to call for evidence from Committee for Justice on Domestic Abuse and Family Proceedings Bill	Katz 2019	Examples of children's experiences of domestic abuse and disclosure; evidence that a strong relationship with the parent victim improves children's chances of recovery.
2020	(United Kingdom)	HM Government, Ministry of Justice	Literature review for Assessing Risk of Harm to Children and Parents in Private Law Children Cases: Final Report	Katz 2016a	General findings – referenced/paraphrased in sections 1.2, 4.4, 5.2, 5.2.1, and 6.3.

Katz was a member of the expert advisory panel for Research England's Domestic Abuse Policy Guidance for UK Universities 2021.

== Publications ==
- Coercive Control in Children’s and Mothers’ Lives (Oxford University Press, 2022).

She has also written for the academic journal Child Abuse Review.

== Award nominations ==
Year	Organisation		Work	Award	Result	Ref.
2016	(United States) (United Kingdom)	Wiley	Katz 2016a	Wiley Best Paper Prize (Note: Awarded to papers of "high quality and impact" published in the journal Child Abuse Review.)	Won	
2016	(European Union) (Austria)	Women Against Violence Europe	Katz 2016a	Corinna Seith Award	Won	
2022	(United Kingdom)	Clear Path UK Awards	Herself	Cycle Breaker Award	Won	

== Media ==
In March 2020 Katz's research was cited in a Guardian article by Jess Hill on the murder of Hannah Clarke in Brisbane, Australia. In the same month Katz featured in an ITV News report on the Coronation Street coercive control storyline involving the characters Yasmeen Nazir and Geoff Metcalfe.

In November 2022 an article published on the Bristol Cable news website included quotes from Katz criticising the use of parental alienation counter-accusations by parents accused of domestic violence or child abuse in family courts.
