= Freda Briggs =

Australian child protection advocate

Freda Briggs AO
- Born: Freda Akeroyd; 1 December 1930; Huddersfield, England
- Died: 6 April 2016 (aged 85); Adelaide, Australia
- Occupations: Teacher, social worker, academic, author
- Known for: Child protection expert
- Title: Emeritus professor
- Awards: Inaugural Australian Humanitarian Award 1998; Senior Australian of the Year 2000; Officer of the Order of Australia 2005

Academic background
- Education: Warwick University; Sheffield University

Academic work
- Discipline: Education
- Sub-discipline: Early childhood Child abuse and child protection
- Institutions: University of South Australia

Freda Briggs AO (1 December 1930 – 6 April 2016) was an Australian academic, author and child protection advocate. In 2000, she was named Senior Australian of the Year for her pioneering work in child protection.

== Early life and education ==
Briggs was born Freda Akeroyd on 1 December 1930 in Huddersfield, England. She had one brother, nine years her junior. She attended Deighton Council School and Royds Hall School.

Briggs worked briefly as an office clerk at Imperial Chemical Industries before joining the London Metropolitan Police, working in child protection. She said in 2007 that she joined the police after seeing an advertisement in a local paper seeking female police recruits, noting that it offered free accommodation and food.

In 1963, Briggs started studying by correspondence, eventually completing a teacher training course at Warwick University. She worked as a teacher and social worker in Derbyshire for six years. She completed a graduate degree in education and obtained postgraduate qualifications in psychology and sociology at the University of Sheffield and became a lecturer in child development.

== Career ==
Briggs emigrated to Melbourne in 1975 to become Director of Early Childhood Studies at the State College of Victoria (now part of Monash University). She moved to Adelaide in 1980, where she became dean of the Institute of Early Childhood and Family Studies at the University of South Australia and established a pioneering child protection course. In 2004, the Prime Minister of Australia, John Howard, recognised her work by awarding a $10 million endowment for the provision of the National Child Protection Research Centre at the university. In 2005, she was appointed Foundation Chair of Child Development and an emeritus professor, lecturing in sociology, child protection and family studies.

Briggs provided assistance to royal commissions and parliamentary inquiries and wrote numerous submissions to state and federal inquiries relating to child protection, including the Mullighan Inquiry in South Australia (2004–2008) and the Royal Commission into Institutional Responses to Child Sexual Abuse. She advised police forces in Australia and New Zealand and was a media consultant on child protection issues relating to TV, movies and computer games. Briggs was considered one of Australia's leading experts about child abuse issues and an outspoken advocate for children's rights internationally.

Briggs was a patron for the Adelaide Women's and Children's Hospital paediatric palliative care project and a South Australia ambassador to the prime minister's department on the recognition of women. She also campaigned with success against mandatory retirement from the workforce at 65.

== Personal life ==
Briggs married Kenneth Briggs in 1952. They became foster carers early in their marriage and had two children of their own.

== Death ==
Briggs died at the Royal Adelaide Hospital on 6 April 2016 at age 85.

== Awards and honours ==
Briggs was the inaugural recipient of the Australian Humanitarian Award in 1998. She was named Senior Australian of the Year in 2000 and became an officer of the Order of Australia in 2005. She was also a recipient of the Anzac Fellowship Award, the national Centenary Medal, the Jean Denton Memorial Fellowship and the Creswick Fellowship Award.

In 2009, Briggs received an honorary Doctor of Letters degree from the University of Sheffield for outstanding research, publications and contributions to education relating to child abuse and child protection.

== Selected publications ==
=== Books ===
- Briggs, Freda (1986). Child sexual abuse: confronting the problem. South Melbourne, Victoria: Pitman. ISBN 9780858963870.
- Briggs, Freda (1993). Why my child?: Supporting the families of victims of child sexual abuse. Sydney: Allen & Unwin. ISBN 9780788155437.
- Briggs, Freda, ed. (1995). From victim to offender: how child abuse victims become offenders. St. Leonards, NSW, Australia: Allen and Unwin. ISBN 9781863737593.
- Briggs, Freda, ed. (1994). Children and families: Australian perspectives. St Leonards, NSW, Australia: Allen & Unwin. ISBN 9781863736268.
- Briggs, Freda (1995). Developing personal safety skills in children with disabilities. London: Jessica Kingsley Publishers. ISBN 9781853022456.
- Briggs, Freda; Hawkins, Russell M. F. (1998). Dare to Support Your Kids: A drug education programme for parents. Wellington: NZ Police/DARE Foundation. OCLC 975361659.
- Briggs, Freda; Potter, Gillian K. (1999). The early years of school: teaching and learning. South Melbourne, Victoria: Addison Wesley Longman. ISBN 9780733901706.
- Briggs, Freda; McVeity, Michael (2000). Teaching children to protect themselves: a resource for teachers and adults who care for young children. Crows Nest, NSW: Allen & Unwin. ISBN 9781864489927.
- Briggs, Freda (2002). To what extent can "Keeping Ourselves Safe" protect children?. Wellington, N.Z: New Zealand Police. ISBN 9780477029636. PUB L 169.
- Briggs, Freda (2011). Smart parenting for safer kids: helping children to make smart choices and stay safe. Docklands, Victoria: JoJo Publishing. ISBN 9780980871005.
- Briggs, Freda (2013). Child protection: the essential guide for teachers and professionals whose work involves children. Docklands, Victoria: JoJo Publishing. ISBN 9780987463579.

=== Book chapters ===
- Briggs, Freda (1996), "To what extent can child protection programs protect children?", in Taylor, Nicola J.; Smith, Anne B. (eds.), Investing in children: primary prevention strategies : proceedings of the Children's Issues Centre Inaugural Child and Family Policy Conference, 10–13 July 1996, Dunedin, Dunedin, N.Z: Otago University Press, ISBN 9780958359511.
- Briggs, Freda (1999), "To what extent can child protection programs protect children?The importance of parent participation in child protection curricula", in Berk, Laura E. (ed.), Landscapes of development: an anthology of readings, Belmont, CA: Wadsworth Pub, ISBN 9780534543785.
- Briggs, Freda (2006), "The role of the teacher in child protection", in Australian College of Educators (ed.), Australian College of Educators Yearbook.

=== Journal articles ===
- Briggs, Freda; Lehmann, Karen (1989). "Significance of children's drawings in cases of sexual abuse". Early Child Development and Care. 47 (1): 131–147. doi:10.1080/0300443890470107.
- Briggs, Freda (1991). "Child protection programmes - Can they protect young children?". Early Child Development and Care. 67 (1): 61–72. doi:10.1080/0300443910670106.
- Briggs, Freda; Hawkins, Russell M. F. (1994). "Choosing between child protection programmes". Child Abuse Review. 3 (4): 272–283. doi:10.1002/car.2380030406.
- Briggs, Freda; Hawkins, Russell M. F. (August 1994). "Follow-up data on the effectiveness of New Zealand's national school based child protection program". Child Abuse & Neglect. 18 (8): 635–643. doi:10.1016/0145-2134(94)90013-2. PMID 7953903.
- Briggs, Freda; Hawkins, Russell M. F. (1995). "Protecting boys from the risk of sexual abuse". Early Child Development and Care. 110 (1): 19–32. doi:10.1080/0300443951100102.
- Briggs, Freda; Hawkins, Russell M. F. (October 1996). "Low socio-economic status children are disadvantaged in the provision of school based child protection programmes". The British Journal of Social Work. 26 (5): 667–678. doi:10.1093/oxfordjournals.bjsw.a011140.
- Briggs, Freda; Hawkins, Russell M. F. (March 1996). "A comparison of the childhood experiences of convicted male child molesters and men who were sexually abused in childhood and claimed to be non offenders". Child Abuse & Neglect. 20 (3): 221–233. doi:10.1016/S0145-2134(95)00145-X. PMID 8734552.
- Briggs, Freda; Hawkins, Russell M. F. (1997). "The institutionalised abuse of children in Australia: Past and present". Early Child Development and Care. 133 (1): 41–55. doi:10.1080/0300443971330104.
- Briggs, Freda; Lian, Ang Bee; Yeo, George; Lushington, Kurt (2001). "Social Worker and Counsellor Perceptions of Singapore's Domestic Violence Prevention System". Asia Pacific Journal of Social Work and Development. 11 (2): 85–108. doi:10.1080/21650993.2001.9755862. S2CID 143254321.
- Briggs, Freda; Hawkins, Russell M. F. (2005). "Personal safety issues in the lives of children with learning disabilities". Children Australia. 30 (2): 19–27. doi:10.1017/S103507720001066X. S2CID 141255038.
