= Liz Kelly =

British anti-abuse academic

Liz Kelly CBE
- Born: 1951 (age 74–75); United Kingdom

Elizabeth A. Kelly CBE (born 1951) is a British professor and director of the Child and Woman Abuse Studies Unit (CWASU), London Metropolitan University, former head of the, now defunct, Women's National Commission, and co-chair, along with Marai Larasi, of the End Violence Against Women Coalition.

== Career ==
Kelly has written numerous papers and articles relating to violence against women and children, and has been a guest editor on the journal Child Abuse Review.

Her review of why so many alleged rapists go unprosecuted and unconvicted, which she conducted for the Crown Prosecution Service Inspectorate, stated, "that at each stage of the legal process, stereotypes and prejudices play a part in decision-making".

In her book "The Hidden Gender of Law", Kelly argues "there is no clear distinction between consensual sex and rape, but a continuum of pressure, threat, coercion and force". She claims that all women experience sexual violence at some points in their lives.

Kelly's publication "Surviving Sexual Violence" defines sexual violence as including "any physical, visual, verbal or sexual act that is experienced by the woman or girl, at the time or later, as a threat, invasion or assault, that has the effect of hurting her or degrading her and/or takes away her ability to control". Such a definition was criticised by Wendy McElroy, describing it as "disastrously subjective" also noting "regret is not a benchmark of consent".

Kelly was awarded the CBE in the 2000 New Years Honours, for services to combating violence against women and children.

== Recognition ==
She was recognized as one of the BBC's 100 women of 2017.

== Bibliography ==
=== Books ===
- Kelly, Liz (1988). Surviving sexual violence. Feminist Perspectives Series. Minneapolis: University of Minnesota Press. ISBN 9780816617531.
- Kelly, Elizabeth (1995). Surviving sexual abuse. Health Books Series. Rushcutters Bay, New South Wales: Gore & Osment. ISBN 9781875531783.
- Kelly, Elizabeth A. (1995). Education, democracy, and public knowledge. Boulder Colorado: Westview Press. ISBN 9780813316345.
- Liz, Kelly; Hester, Marianne; Radford, Jill (1996). Women, violence, and male power: feminist activism, research, and practice. Buckingham Philadelphia: Open University Press. ISBN 9780335195060.
- Liz, Kelly; Burton, Sheila; Regan, Linda (1998). Supporting women and challenging men: lessons from the Domestic Violence Intervention Project. Bristol: Policy Press. ISBN 9781861340689.
- Liz, Kelly; Hague, Gill; Mullender, Audrey (2001). Challenging violence against women: the Canadian experience. Bristol, UK: Policy Press. ISBN 9781861342782.
- Liz, Kelly; Mullender, Audrey; Regan, Linda; Hague, Gill; Imam, Umme; Malos, Ellen (2002). Children's perspectives on domestic violence. London: SAGE. ISBN 9780761971061.
- Liz, Kelly; Rehman, Yasmin; Siddiqui, Hannana (2013). Moving in the shadows: violence in the lives of minority women and children. Farnham, Surrey Burlington, Vermont: Ashgate. ISBN 9781409433170.

=== Chapters in books ===
- Kelly, Liz (1988), "How women define their experiences of violence", in Yllö, Kersti; Bograd, Michele (eds.), Feminist perspectives on wife abuse, Newbury Park, California: A Sage Focus Edition, pp. 114–132, ISBN 9780803930537.
- Kelly, Liz; Regan, Linda; Burton, Sheila (1992), "Defending the indefensible? Quantitative methods and feminist research", in Phoenix, Ann; Hinds, Hilary; Stacey, Jackie (eds.), Working out: New directions for women's studies, Gender and Society: Feminist Perspectives on Past and Present, London Washington, D.C: The Falmer Press, pp. 149–160, ISBN 9780750700436.
- Kelly, Liz (1994), "The interconnectedness of domestic violence and child abuse: challenges for research, policy and practice", in Mullender, Audrey; Morley, Rebecca (eds.), Children living with domestic violence: putting men's abuse of women on the child care agenda, London Concord, Massachusetts: Whiting & Birch., ISBN 9781871177725.
- Kelly, Liz (1996), "'It's everywhere': sexual violence as a continuum", in Jackson, Stevi; Scott, Sue (eds.), Feminism and sexuality: a reader, New York: Columbia University Press, pp. 191–206, ISBN 9780231107082.
- Kelly, Liz (1996), "Tensions and possibilities: enhancing informal responses to domestic violence", in Edleson, Jeffrey; Eisikovits, Zvi C. (eds.), Future interventions with battered women and their families, Sage Series on Violence Against Women, Thousand Oaks, California: SAGE, pp. 67–86, ISBN 9780803959453.
- Kelly, Liz; Regan, Linda; Burton, Sheila (1996), "Beyond victim or survivor: sexual violence, identity and feminist theory and practice", in Adkins, Lisa; Merchant, Vicki (eds.), Sexualizing the social: power and the organization of sexuality, New York: St. Martin's Press, pp. 77–101, ISBN 9780312160258.
- Kelly, Liz; Radford, Jill (1998), "Sexual violence against women and girls: an approach to an international overview", in Dobash, R. Emerson; Dobash, Russell P. (eds.), Rethinking violence against women, Sage Series on Violence Against Women, Thousand Oaks, California: SAGE, pp. 53–76, ISBN 9780761911876.
- Kelly, Liz (2000), "The global context: Wars against women: sexual violence, sexual politics and the militarised state", in Jacobs, Susie; Jacobson, Ruth; Marchbank, Jennifer (eds.), States of conflict: gender, violence, and resistance, London New York: Zed Books, pp. 45–65, ISBN 9781856496568. Pdf.
- Kelly, Liz; Coy, Maddy; Horvath, Miranda A.H. (2012), "Troubling notions of male entitlement: men consuming, boasting and confessing about paying for sex", in Coy, Maddy (ed.), Prostitution, harm and gender inequality: theory, research and policy, Farnham, Surrey, England Burlington, Vermont: Ashgate, pp. 121–140, ISBN 9781409405450.
- Kelly, Liz (2013), "Sex, sexuality and child sexual abuse", in Wild, Jim (ed.), Exploiting childhood: how fast food, material obsession and porn culture are creating new forms of child abuse, London: Jessica Kingsley Publishers, pp. 145–148, ISBN 9780857007421.
- Kelly, Liz; Westmarland, Nicole (2015), "New approaches to assessing effectiveness and outcomes of domestic violence perpetrator programs", in Johnson, Holly; Fisher, Bonnie S.; Jaquier, Véronique (eds.), Critical issues on violence against women: international perspectives and promising strategies, London: Routledge, pp. 183–194, ISBN 9781135006037.
- Kelly, Liz; Coy, Maddy; Dustin, Holly (2015), "A feminist "epistemic community" reshaping public policy: a case study of the End Violence Against Women Coalition", in Johnson, Holly; Fisher, Bonnie S.; Jaquier, Véronique (eds.), Critical issues on violence against women: international perspectives and promising strategies, London: Routledge, pp. 244–257, ISBN 9781135006037.

=== Journal articles ===
- Kelly, Liz; Radford, Jill (December 1990). "'Nothing really happened': the invalidation of women's experiences of sexual violence". Critical Social Policy. 10 (30). Sage: 39–53. doi:10.1177/026101839001003003. S2CID 144940008.
- Kelly, Liz (Summer 1991). "Unspeakable acts: women who abuse". Trouble & Strife. 21. Trouble & Strife Collective: 13–20. Pdf.
- Kelly, Liz (guest editor); Kennedy, Margaret (guest editor) (December 1992). "Inclusion not exclusion". Child Abuse Review. 1 (3). Wiley: 147–149. doi:10.1002/car.2380010303.
- Kelly, Liz (December 1992). "The connections between disability and child abuse: a review of the research evidence". Child Abuse Review. 1 (3). Wiley: 157–167. doi:10.1002/car.2380010305.
- Kelly, Liz (December 1992). "Can't hear or won't hear? — the evidential experience of children with disabilities". Child Abuse Review. 1 (3). Wiley: 188–190. doi:10.1002/car.2380010311.
- Kelly, Liz (Summer 1996). "Weasel words: pedophiles and the cycle of abuse". Trouble & Strife. 33. Trouble & Strife Collective: 44–49. Pdf.
- Kelly, Liz; Regan, Linda (January 2000). "Sexual exploitation of children in Europe: Child pornography". Journal of Sexual Aggression. 6 (1–2). Taylor and Francis: 6–28. doi:10.1080/13552600008413307. S2CID 144202513.
- Liz, Kelly; Mullender, Audrey; Hague, Gill; Imam, Umme; Malos, Ellen (January 2002). "How do children understand and cope with domestic violence?". Practice. 14 (1). Taylor and Francis: 17–26. doi:10.1080/09503150208414289. S2CID 57355820.
- Kelly, Liz (January 2003). "The wrong debate: reflections on why force is not the key issue with respect to trafficking in women for sexual exploitation". Feminist Review. 73 (1). Palgrave Macmillan: 139–144. doi:10.1057/palgrave.fr.9400086. JSTOR 1396003. S2CID 145604841.
- Kelly, Liz (September 2004). "The perils of inclusion and exclusion: international debates on the status of trafficked women as victims". International Review of Victimology. 11 (1). SAGE: 33–47. doi:10.1177/026975800401100103. S2CID 146124065.
- Kelly, Liz (January 2005). ""You can find anything you want": a critical reflection on research on trafficking in persons within and into Europe". International Migration. 43 (1–2). Wiley: 235–265. doi:10.1111/j.0020-7985.2005.00319.x.
- Kelly, Liz (December 2005). "Inside outsiders: Mainstreaming violence against women into human rights discourse and practice". International Feminist Journal of Politics. 7 (4). Taylor and Francis: 471–495. doi:10.1080/14616740500284391. S2CID 143985481.
- Kelly, Liz; Horvath, Miranda A.H. (March 2009). "Multiple perpetrator rape: Naming an offence and initial research findings". Journal of Sexual Aggression. 15 (1). Taylor and Francis: 83–96. doi:10.1080/13552600802653818. S2CID 143784094.
- Kelly, Liz (guest editor); Pringle, Keith (guest editor) (November 2009). "Editorial: Gender and child harm". Child Abuse Review. 18 (6). Wiley: 367–371. doi:10.1002/car.1097.
- Kelly, Liz; Coy, Maddy; Bowstead, Janet; Foord, Jo (March 2011). "Roads to nowhere? Mapping specialised violence against women services". Violence Against Women. 17 (3). Sage: 404–425. doi:10.1177/1077801211398637. PMID 26086982. S2CID 30738830.
- Kelly, Liz; Chambers, Jemma C.; Horvath, Miranda A.H. (April 2013). "Reconstructing and sequencing behaviours in multiple perpetrator rape". Psychology, Crime & Law. 19 (3). Taylor and Francis: 253–275. doi:10.1080/1068316X.2011.631537. S2CID 143978419.
- Kelly, Liz; Westmarland, Nicole (September 2013). "Why extending measurements of 'success' in domestic violence perpetrator programmes matters for social work". The British Journal of Social Work. 43 (6). Oxford Journals: 1092–1110. doi:10.1093/bjsw/bcs049.

=== Papers ===
==== For the CWASU ====
- Kelly, Liz; McGibbon, Alison; Cooper, Libby (1989). "What support?": an exploratory study of Council policy and practice, and local support services in the area of domestic violence within Hammersmith and Fulham: final report. London: Child and Woman Abuse Studies Unit (CWASU), London Metropolitan University. OCLC 779176979.
- Kelly, Liz; Regan, Linda; Burton, Sheila; Wingfield, Rachel (1995). Splintered lives: sexual exploitation of children in the context of children's rights and child protection. London: Child and Woman Abuse Studies Unit (CWASU), London Metropolitan University. Archived from the original on 26 October 2019. Pdf.
- Kelly, Liz; Mullender, Audrey; Debbonaire, Thangam; Hague, Gill; Malos, Ellen (1996). Children, domestic violence and refuges: a study of needs and responses. London: Women's Aid Federation England Ltd. ISBN 9780907817659.
- Kelly, Liz (1998). Supporting women and challenging men: lessons from the Domestic Violence Intervention Project. With Julie Bindel, Sheila Burton, Dianne Butterworth, Kate Cook and Linda Regan. Bristol: Joseph Rowntree Foundation. ISBN 9781861340689. Online. Pdf.
- Kelly, Liz; Regan, Linda; Burton, Sheila; Kitzinger, Jenny (1998). Young people's attitudes towards violence, sex and relationships: a survey and focus group study. London: Child and Woman Abuse Studies Unit (CWASU), London Metropolitan University with the Media Research Unit, University of Glasgow. Archived from the original on 12 August 2016. Pdf from Zero Tolerance.
- Kelly, Liz; Regan, Linda; Burton, Sheila (1998). An exploratory study of the prevalence of sexual abuse in a sample of 16-21 year olds. London: Child and Woman Abuse Studies Unit (CWASU), London Metropolitan University. OCLC 59908155. Pdf.
- Kelly, Liz; Regan, Linda; Burton, Sheila (1998). Legacies of abuse - 'Its more complicated than that': a qualitative study of the meaning and impacts of sexual abuse in childhood. London: Child and Woman Abuse Studies Unit (CWASU), London Metropolitan University. ISBN 9781853772535. End of award report to the ESRC.
- Kelly, Liz; Regan, Linda (1999). Teenage tolerance: the hidden lives of young Irish people: a study of young peoples experience and responses to violence and abuse. Dublin: Dublin Women's Aid and the Child and Woman Abuse Studies Unit (CWASU), London Metropolitan University. OCLC 779127847. Details online.
- Kelly, Liz; Mullender, Audrey; Iman, Umme F.; Hague, Gill; Malos, Ellen (1999). Children's needs coping strategies and understanding of woman abuse. Swindon: ESRC Full Research Report. OCLC 779177788. L129251037. Archived from the original on 8 July 2012.
- Kelly, Liz; Mullender, Audrey; Humphreys, Catherine; Hester, Marianne; Abrahams, Hilary; Lowe, Pam (2000). From good intentions to good practice: mapping services working with families where there is domestic violence. Bristol: Joseph Rowntree Foundation. ISBN 9781861342454. Online. Pdf.
- Kelly, Liz; Regan, Linda (2000). Rhetorics and realities: sexual exploitation of children in Europe. London: Child and Woman Abuse Studies Unit (CWASU), London Metropolitan University. ISBN 9781853773105.
- Kelly, Liz; Mullender, Audrey; Hague, Gill (2001). Challenging violence against women: the Canadian experience. Bristol, UK: Policy Press. ISBN 9781861342782.
- Kelly, Liz; Regan, Linda (2003). Good practice in medical responses to recently reported rape, especially forensic examinations: a briefing paper for the Daphne Strengthening the Linkages Project. London: Child and Woman Abuse Studies Unit (CWASU), London Metropolitan University for Rape Crisis Network Europe. ISBN 9780954480325.
- Kelly, Liz; Seith, Corinna (2003). Achievements against the grain: self-defence training for women and girls in Europe. London: Child and Woman Abuse Studies Unit (CWASU), London Metropolitan University for Rape Crisis Network Europe. ISBN 9780954480301.
- Kelly, Liz (2003). Rape: still a forgotten issue: briefing document for strengthening the linkages - consolidating the European Network Project. London: Child and Woman Abuse Studies Unit (CWASU), London Metropolitan University for Rape Crisis Network Europe. ISBN 9780954480332.
- Kelly, Liz; Regan, Linda; Wingfield, Rachel (2003). Worth less or worth more? An evaluation of the Maze Marigold Project. London: Child and Woman Abuse Studies Unit (CWASU), London Metropolitan University for YWCA. ISBN 9780954480318.
- Kelly, Liz; Bindel, Julie (2003). A critical examination of responses to prostitution in four countries: Victoria; Australia; Ireland; the Netherlands; Sweden. London: Child and Woman Abuse Studies Unit (CWASU), London Metropolitan University for Routes Out Partnership Board. OCLC 779173242. Pdf.
- Kelly, Liz; Coy, Maddy; Horvarth, Miranda (2007). 'It's just like going to the supermarket': men buying sex in East London: report for Safe Exit Tower Hamlets. London: Child and Woman Abuse Studies Unit (CWASU), London Metropolitan University for Rape Crisis Network Europe. ISBN 9780954480356. Pdf.
- Liz, Kelly; Horvarth, Miranda; Uzelac, Gordana; Lovett, Jo (January 2007). Rape in the 21st Century; old behaviours, new contexts and emerging powers. London: Child and Woman Abuse Studies Unit (CWASU), London Metropolitan University for Rape Crisis Network Europe. Archived from the original on 8 July 2012. Pdf. Funded by the ESRC.
- Kelly, Liz; Horvarth, Miranda (June 2007). From the outset: why violence should be a priority for the Commission for Equality and Human Rights. London: Child and Woman Abuse Studies Unit (CWASU), London Metropolitan University. Funded by Equal Opportunities Commission and the Roddick Foundation.
- Kelly, Liz; Regan, Linda; Morris, Anne; Dibb, Rebecca (July 2007). 'If only we'd known': an exploratory study of seven intimate partner homicides in Engleshire – final report to the Engleshire Domestic Violence Homicide Review Group. London: Child and Woman Abuse Studies Unit (CWASU), London Metropolitan University. Archived from the original on 1 October 2015. Pdf.
- Kelly, Liz; Sen, Purna (2008). CEDAW thematic shadow report: violence against women in the UK: 2007. London: Child and Woman Abuse Studies Unit (CWASU), London Metropolitan University for CEDAW. ISBN 9780954480370. Pdf.
- Liz, Kelly; Turner, Jackie (September 2008). Nordic Baltic pilot project for the support, protection, safe return and rehabilitation of women victims of trafficking for sexual exploitation: Evaluation report. London: Child and Woman Abuse Studies Unit (CWASU), London Metropolitan University.
- Kelly, Liz; Lovett, Jo; Burman, Michele (May 2009). Different systems, similar outcomes? Tracking attrition in reported rape cases in eleven European countries (Country briefing: Scotland). London: Child and Woman Abuse Studies Unit (CWASU), London Metropolitan University. ISBN 9780954480394 Pdf. Final report, pdf. Funded by the European Commission Daphne II Programme.
- Kelly, Liz; Coy, Maddy; Lee, Kerry; Roach, Colleen (July 2010). A missing link? An exploratory study of the connections between non-consensual sex and teenage pregnancy. London: Child and Woman Abuse Studies Unit (CWASU), London Metropolitan University. Archived from the original on 1 October 2015.
- Kelly, Liz; Hagemann-White, Carol; Meysen, Thomas; Römkens, Renée (2011). Realising rights: case studies on state responses to violence against women and children in Europe. London: Child and Woman Abuse Studies Unit (CWASU), London Metropolitan University. ISBN 9780954480387. Pdf.
- Kelly, Liz; Coy, Maddy; Thiara, Ravi K.; Phillips, Ruth (2011). Into the foreground: an evaluation of the Jacana Parenting Programme. London: Child and Woman Abuse Studies Unit (CWASU), London Metropolitan University. Pdf.
- Kelly, Liz; Regan, Linda; Mouj, Anjum; Lovett, Jo (2011). Everywhere and anywhere: a focus group study on domestic violence information and awareness raising. London: Child and Woman Abuse Studies Unit (CWASU), London Metropolitan University for the Trust for London and the Henry Smith Charity. Unpublished report, parts of which are quoted in this pdf.
- Kelly, Liz; Coy, Maddy; Thiara, Ravi K. (May 2011). Boys think girls are toys?: An evaluation of the NIA Project Prevention Programme on sexual exploitation. London: Child and Woman Abuse Studies Unit (CWASU), London Metropolitan University. Archived from the original on 1 October 2015. Pdf.
- Kelly, Liz; Coy, Maddy; Elvines, Fiona; Garner, Maria; Kanyeredzi, Ava (November 2013). "Sex without consent, I suppose that is rape": How young people in England understand sexual consent. London: Child and Woman Abuse Studies Unit (CWASU), London Metropolitan University. Archived from the original on 2 October 2015. Pdf. A report commissioned for the Office of the Children's Commissioner's Inquiry into Child Sexual Exploitation in Gangs and Groups.
- Kelly, Liz; Sharp, Nicola; Klein, Renate (2014). Finding the cost of freedom. London: Solace Women's Aid / Child and Woman Abuse Studies Unit (CWASU), London Metropolitan University. Archived from the original on 17 June 2016. Pdf.

==== Home Office ====
- Kelly, Liz; Bindel, Julie; Burton, Sheila; Butterworth, Dianne; Cook, Kate; Regan, Linda (1999). Domestic violence matters: an evaluation of a development project. London: Home Office, Research Studies. ISBN 9781840821376. 193. Pdf.
- Kelly, Liz; Regan, Linda (2000). Stopping traffic: exploring the extent of, and responses to trafficking in women for sexual exploitation in the UK. London: Home Office, Policing and Reducing Crime Unit. ISBN 9781840824667. 125. Pdf.
- Kelly, Liz; Regan, Linda; Lovett, Jo (2004). Sexual Assault Referral Centres: developing good practice and maximising potentials. London: Home Office Research Study. ISBN 9781844732869. 285. Pdf.
- Kelly, Liz; Regan, Linda; Lovett, Jo (2004). Forensic nursing an option for improving responses to reported rape and sexual assault. London: Home Office Development and Practice. ISBN 9781844733187. 31.
- Kelly, Liz; Regan, Linda; Lovett, Jo (2005). A gap or a chasm?: Attrition in reported rape cases. London: Home Office Research, Development and Statistics Directorate. ISBN 9781844735556. 293. Pdf.
- Kelly, Liz; Temkin, Jennifer; Griffiths, Sue (2006). Section 41 an evaluation of new legislation limiting sexual history evidence in rape trials. London: Home Office Online Reports. ISBN 9781844739264. OLR 20/06. Online. Pdf.
- Kelly, Liz (2013). Evaluation of the pilot of domestic violence protection orders. Joanna R. Adler; Miranda A.H. Horvarth; Jo Lovett; Mark Coulson; David Kernohan; and Mark Gray. London: Home Office, Crime research and analysis. ISBN 9781782462620. 76. Online. Pdf. Evaluation of Domestic Violence Protection Orders (DVPOs) for the International Crime and Policing Conference 2015.

==== Other papers ====
- Kelly, Liz (October 2001). Routes to (in)justice: a research review on the reporting, investigation and prosecution of rape cases. London: HM Crown Prosecution Service Inspectorate (HMCPSI). OCLC 224119621. A literature review ahead of report commissioned by HMCPSI and published the following year. Pdf.
- Kelly, Liz (2002). A research review on the reporting, investigation and prosecution of rape cases. London: HM Crown Prosecution Service Inspectorate (HMCPSI). OCLC 50329254. Commissioned by HMCPSI to inform their thematic review into the investigation and prosecution of cases involving allegations of rape.
- Kelly, Liz (2002). Journeys of jeopardy: a review of research on trafficking in women and children in Europe. IOM migration research series. Vienna, Austria: International Organization for Migration. OCLC 51758037. no. 11. Pdf.
- Kelly, Liz (2003). Violence against women and children: Vision, Innovation and Professionalism in policing (VIP Guide). Strasbourg: Council of Europe Publishing (Editions du Conseil de l'Europe). ISBN 9789287151216.
- Kelly, Liz; Sen, Purna; Humphreys, Catherine (2004). CEDAW thematic shadow report: violence against women in the UK: 2003. London: Women’s National Commission, Amnesty International and Indigo Trust. OCLC 779148189. Online.
- Kelly, Liz; Lovett, Jo (February 2005). What a waste: the case for an integrated violence against women strategy. London: Department of Trade and Industry. OCLC 59352200. Archived from the original on 1 October 2015. Pdf.
- Kelly, Liz (2005). Fertile fields: trafficking in persons in Central Asia: a report. Vienna, Austria: International Organization for Migration. ISBN 9789290682431. Pdf.
- Kelly, Liz; Coy, Maddy; Foord, Jo (2007). Map of gaps: the postcode lottery of violence against women support services. London: End Violence Against Women. Archived from the original on 2 October 2015. ISBN 9780954480363 Pdf.
- Kelly, Liz; Coy, Maddy; Lovett, Jo (2008). Realising rights, fulfilling obligations: a template for an integrated strategy on violence against women for the UK. London: End Violence Against Women. Archived from the original on 4 March 2016. ISBN 9780955860928 Pdf.
- Kelly, Liz; Westmarland, Nicole; Brown, Jennifer; Horvath, Miranda (April 2010). Connections and disconnections: assessing evidence, knowledge and practice in responses to rape. London: Government Equalities Office. OCLC 785808273. Pdf.
- Kelly, Liz; Westmarland, Nicole; Brown, Jennifer; Horvath, Miranda (April 2010). Has anything changed? Results of a comparative study (1977-2010) on opinions on rape. London: Government Equalities Office. OCLC 912957804. Pdf.
