= End Violence Against Women Coalition =

British charitable organization

- Abbreviation: EVAW
- Formation: 2 November 2005; 21 years ago
- Type: Charity
- Registration no.: 1161132 (Charity Commission)
- Purpose: Campaigns to end all forms of violence against women
- Headquarters: Unit 221 Chinaworks, Black Prince Road, London SE1 7SJ
- Co-chair: Aisha K. Gill
- Co-chair: Gurpreet Virdee
- Website: www.endviolenceagainstwomen.org.uk

End Violence Against Women Coalition (EVAW) is a UK-based coalition of individuals and organisations that campaigns to end all forms of violence against women. It was founded in 2005 and became a registered charity 31 March 2015.

== History ==
The End Violence Against Women Coalition was originally established by the, now defunct, non-departmental public body (NDPB), the Women's National Commission (WNC), as a working group in early 2005. Initially it published What a Waste: The Case for an Integrated Violence Against Women Strategy, and in November of the same year it launched with the publication of "Making the Grade? An Independent Analysis of Government Initiatives on Violence Against Women, a survey of the work being done by central Government in the UK on violence against women, and highlighting the gaps in the provision of services.

On 31 March 2015, the coalition became a registered charity, co-chaired by Liz Kelly and Marai Larasi. Current co-chairs are Gurpreet Virdee and Aisha K. Gill.

== Members ==
- Amnesty International UK
- Ashiana Network
- Asylum Aid
- AVA Against Violence & Abuse
- BAWSO
- Bristol Fawcett Society
- Bristol Feminist Network
- British Humanist Association
- Child and Woman Abuse Studies Unit (CWASU)
- Durham University
- Eaves
- Equality Now
- Fawcett Society
- Forward UK
- imkaan
- IKWRO
- Jewish Women's Aid
- Lancaster University
- Latin American Women's Aid (LAWADV)
- London Feminist Network
- NASUWT
- NAWO
- Newham Asian Women's Project
- nia
- Northern Ireland Women's Aid
- NUS
- OBJECT
- Rape Crisis England and Wales
- Rape Crisis (Scotland)
- Rape Crisis (South London)
- Refuge
- RESPECT
- Rights of women
- RMT
- Roehampton University
- Scottish Women's Aid
- Shakti Women's Aid
- South Essex Rape and Incest Crisis Centre (SERICC)
- Southall Black Sisters
- Standing Together
- Surviving Economic Abuse
- Tender
- Trades Union Congress
- UNISON
- Welsh Women's Aid
- White Ribbon Campaign
- Women for Refugee Women
- Women in Prison
- Womankind Worldwide
- Women's Aid
- Women's Budget Group
- Women's Institutes
- Women's Resource Centre
- Young Women's Trust
- Zero Tolerance

== Campaign goals ==
The campaign goals of EVAW are:

1. To ensure that national, regional and local governments in the UK take all steps necessary to prevent and eliminate violence against women and girls.
2. To enable individuals and organisations to become part of a movement to eliminate violence against women and girls.
3. To have violence against women understood as a cause and consequence of women's inequality and a violation of human rights.
4. To share information and innovative practice around the UK to develop campaign strategies and provide a coherent voice to governments.

== Evidence to the Leveson inquiry ==
EVAW, Eaves, Equality Now and Object gave joint evidence to the Leveson Inquiry, a judicial public inquiry into the culture, practices and ethics of the British press following the News International phone hacking scandal.

Accompanying their evidence were three documents. The first detailed how, in their view, media reporting on violence against women and girls (VAWG) commonly upholds myths and stereotypes about VAWG, including victim blaming. The second made recommendations to the inquiry about the reform of press regulation. The final document, Just the Women, was "an evaluation of eleven British national newspapers’ portrayal of women over a two-week period in September 2012, including recommendations on press regulation reform in order to reduce harm to, and discrimination against, women."
