= Nicole Westmarland =

British academic and activist

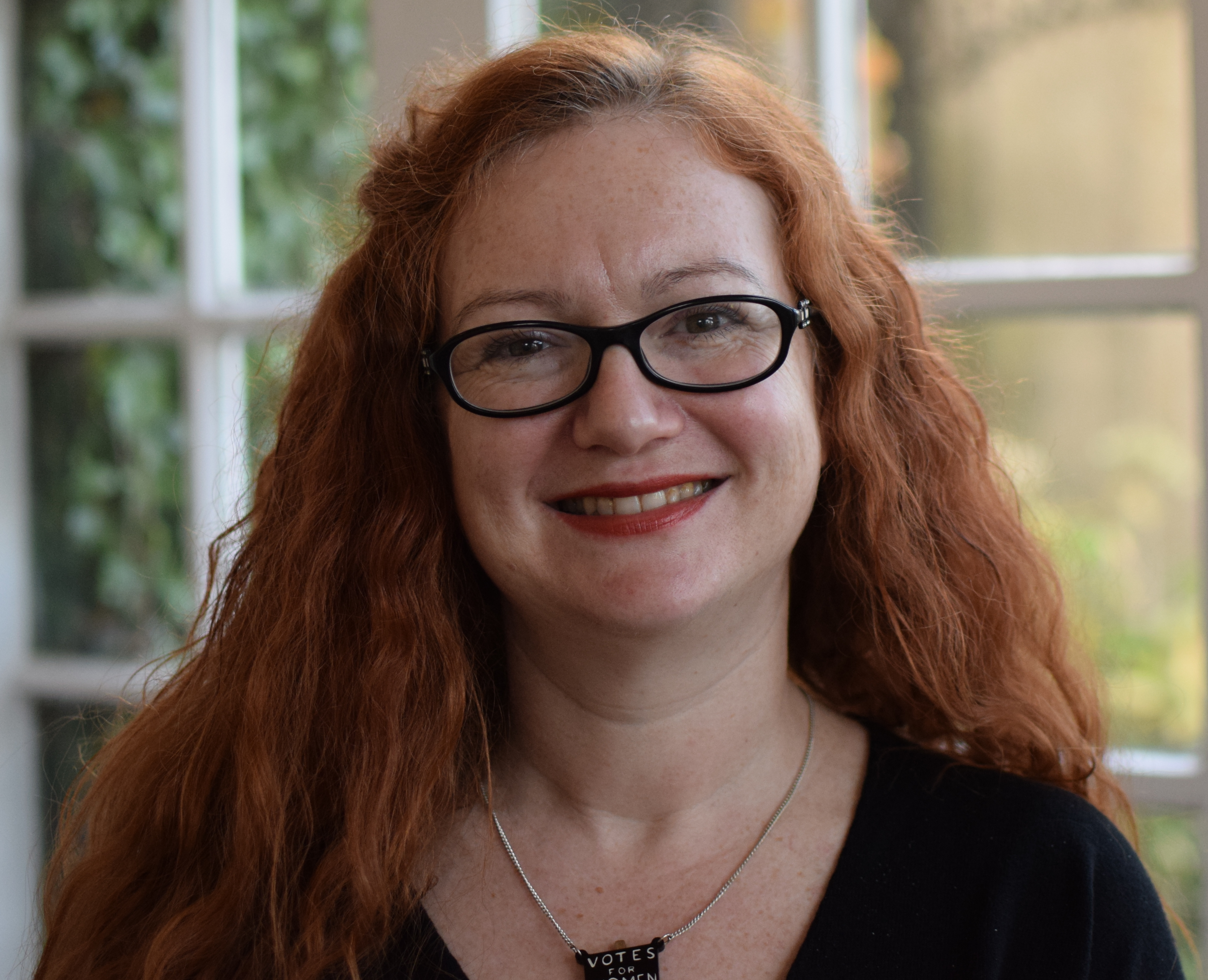
- Nicole Westmarland in 2021
- Born: 1977 (age 48–49); Darlington, County Durham, England
- Occupation: Professor of Criminology at Durham University
- Known for: Academic and activist in the area of male violence against women

Professor Nicole Westmarland (born 1977) is a British academic and activist in the area of violence against women. She is currently a professor at the University of Durham, where she researches rape, domestic violence and prostitution. Westmarland is also the Director and co-founder of the Centre for Research into Violence and Abuse, a multidisciplinary centre dedicated to understanding and responding to violence and abuse. She has authored six influential books, including her 2015 published book Violence against Women: Criminological perspectives on men’s violences. Originally a taxi driver in Darlington, Westmarland’s early work focused on security issues for female taxi drivers. Her undergraduate dissertation found that female drivers were significantly more likely to face sexual harassment from customers than their male counterparts. This work became one of the largest studies of taxi drivers worldwide.

Alongside her academic work, Westmarland is often in the news as a commentator on violence against women. She has appeared on BBC Radio 4's Woman's Hour and written articles for The Telegraph, The Guardian and the New Statesman. In 2007 Westmarland organised the 1st North East Conference on Sexual Violence, which brought together professionals from across various statutory and charity organisations to share knowledge and develop best practice in responding to sexual violence. The conference now runs annually in recognition of the International Day for the Elimination of Violence Against Women. Westmarland has sat on both governmental and non-governmental advisory panels, and has been a special advisor to the House of Commons and House of Lords Joint Committee on Human Rights for their inquiry into violence against women and girls. Professor Westmarland is Vice Chair of Rape Crisis Darlington and Durham and formerly chaired Rape Crisis (England and Wales) for over 5 years. She has been a trustee for Rape Crisis for over 25 years. In 2026 she was named as one of the 'Notable Women of Darlington' by Darlington Soroptimists.

== Biography ==
Westmarland was born in 1977 in Darlington, County Durham, England. She began her academic career at the University of Teesside, where she studied for a BSc (Hons) in Psychology and Women's Studies. She then went on to study at the University of York, where she completed an MA in Women's Studies and a PhD in Social Policy and Social Work.

Westmarland spent her early career working at the University of Bristol. It was here she met Geetanjali Gangoli, with whom she co-edited International Approaches to Prostitution (2006), and later International Approaches to Rape (2011). During her time in Bristol, Westmarland published a number of articles and official reports concerning violence against women, with a particular focus on domestic violence and prostitution. In addition to her academic work, Westmarland plays a significant role within grassroots feminist action and organisation, and it was through volunteering for feminist campaign "Truth about Rape" that she first became involved with Rape Crisis. In 2006, Westmarland became chair of Rape Crisis England and Wales, a position which she held for five years.

Following her time in Bristol, Westmarland returned to the North East to take up a position as lecturer in criminology at Durham University. In 2011, she was promoted to Senior Lecturer and gained her Professorship in 2013. She continues to combine academic work with feminist activism, allowing her research to both inform and be informed by grassroots groups.

== Areas of work ==
=== Rape and Sexual Violence ===
Though she is based within the UK, Westmarland has collaborated with academics from across the world. In 2011, Westmarland and Geetanjali Gangoli published International Approaches to Rape, which combines contributions from international experts to produce a cohesive account of rape law and policy in 10 different countries. International Approaches to Rape illustrates the ways in which countries' approaches to rape interact with women's experiences; and highlights the various interventions and support available within each country.

==== Rape Crisis ====
Westmarland chaired Rape Crisis England and Wales for over five years. Rape Crisis is a registered charity which supports victim-survivors of sexual assault and campaigns to raise awareness of sexual violence. The organisation regularly features in Westmarland's work, with publications focusing upon assessment of the services provided by rape crisis centres, the Rape Crisis movement as a whole, and the lack of funding and concomitant closure of centres.

In 2012 Westmarland and her colleagues published an evaluation of rape crisis centres. They found that women's health and well-being had improved following rape crisis counselling, with particularly positive results in certain areas. For example, following counselling, twice as many women felt in control of their life. The number of women who reported experiencing flashbacks about what happened to them was reduced from 84% to 57%, and the number of women who experienced panic attacks fell from 68% to 43%. There were also reductions in other areas. Following counselling, less than half of the women who had initially reported self-harm were still using this as a coping mechanism, whilst the percentage of women using alcohol to help them cope had reduced from 28% to 11%. Though many women still felt depressed, the number reporting this issue had fallen from 72% to 56%. Around two-fifths of those who had reported suicidal feelings at the initial assessment no longer had thoughts of ending their life. When they first visited Rape Crisis, nearly half of the women (45%) felt too unwell to work or study. Following counselling, this figure was reduced to 29% of women. Overall the study found that the support provided by rape crisis centres was associated with a reduction on all measures of distress created by sexual assault.

==== Police Responses to Victim-Survivors ====
Research carried out in 2012 by Westmarland and colleagues found that women do not think that the police take rape, domestic violence and stalking as seriously as they should. The research, which surveyed 577 women across the North East and Cumbria, found that only half of women would report domestic violence (49%) or stalking (53%) if it happened to them. Whilst most women (89%) said that they would report rape by a stranger, fewer would choose to report rape if it was committed by someone they knew (68%). Women who said that they would not report these crimes cited various reasons; including lack of trust in the police, fear of re-victimisation by the Criminal Justice System, and the emotional impact of pursuing a prosecution. It was found that this pattern was similar across all four police areas in the region: Northumbria, Durham, Cumbria and Cleveland. Westmarland noted:

We know that the police have put additional resources and effort into improving both victim care and investigations. However, this research shows women are still reluctant to make that first step and report these crimes to the police.

==== The Stern Review ====
In 2009, Westmarland was among a team of academics commissioned to provide information for The Stern Review, an independent investigation into the ways in which public authorities respond to rape complaints. Along with Jennifer Brown, Miranda Horvath and Liz Kelly, Westmarland authored a research review which summarised information about rape in the UK, including its prevalence, the support available to victim-survivors, the responses of the health and criminal justice services, and the effect of policy changes.

Westmarland and her colleagues were asked to report upon whether people's attitudes to rape have changed over time. To achieve this, they re-ran a survey which was originally carried out in 1977. Over 2000 participants filled in the survey online, and their responses were compared to those given in 1977. Opinions related to the victim-survivor had shifted: fewer people believed that a woman is responsible if she is raped (34% in 1977; 15% in 2010), and fewer people thought that the victim’s prior sexual experience should be taken into account in the punishment of those found guilty of rape (42% in 1977; 19% in 2010). Respondents were also asked how they would react if a man tried to rape them. In 1977, 65% of women said that they would resist, but in 2010, only 28% said they would resist, with the majority saying that they didn't know or that it would depend on the situation. Westmarland and colleagues suggest that this change may be due to a wider understanding of the different contexts in which rape takes place.

=== Domestic Violence ===
Westmarland has conducted extensive research in the area of domestic abuse. In 2015 Westmarland collaborated with Liz Kelly and colleagues at the Child and Woman Abuse Studies Unit, London Metropolitan University and Charlotte Watts at the Gender Violence and Health Centre, London School of Hygiene and Tropical Medicine on a landmark research programme called Project Mirabal, which evaluated Domestic Abuse Perpetrator Programmes (DAPPs). The research sought to assess the impact of community domestic violence perpetrator programmes on women and children's safety, as well as investigating specific factors that enable violent men to change their behaviour. The research was an independent investigation based upon key issues raised by perpetrator programme workers, via Respect, the UK's umbrella organisation for domestic violence perpetrator programmes.

In 2023, commissioned by the Home Office, Westmarland and Kelly published standards for perpetrator interventions. The project offered evidence-based standards for interventions with perpetrators of domestic abuse, these standards have been internationally recognised.

==== The Westmarland Review ====
In 2017, Westmarland conducted an independent review into the University of Sussex's handling of a domestic abuse case with former student Alison Smith and former staff member Lee Salter. As a leading expert in the field of violence and abuse, Westmarland was commissioned to conduct the review by the University's Vice-Chancellor [at the time] Professor Adam Tickell to address the university's poor and good handling of the case. The review put forward a number of recommendations for university practice in handling cases of domestic abuse. After the publication of the report, a formal apology was issued from the university, after the review highlighted the institution's inadequate response.

=== Prostitution ===
Westmarland's first book, International Approaches to Prostitution: Law and Policy in Europe and Asia, was co-edited with Geetajanli Gangoli and published in 2006. The book addresses prostitution in various European and Asian countries, including England, Sweden, Pakistan and Thailand. The book was the first in a series which also includes International Approaches to Rape. In addition to co-editing this book, Westmarland also co-authored a Home Office report summarising research into issues surrounding street prostitution, such as how to reduce the number of people involved in prostitution, and how to reduce the crime that is associated with street based prostitution.

=== Engaging Men and Boys ===
Westmarland's later work has also focused on engaging men and boys in preventing violence against women and girls. In 2021 she co-authored a book Men's Activism to End Violence Against Women: Voices from Spain, Sweden and the UK. Westmarland and colleagues worked with the Government Equalities Office to provide practical recommendations on how to engage men and boys in topics connected to masculinity and gendered norms. In 2025 she co-produced a policy report with EVAW and the Firebird Foundation which explored the ways men be involved in prevention work.

=== Spiking ===
As well as the above, Westmarland has also conducted influential research on spiking in the UK, particularly 'needle' spiking which involves 'administering drugs (or poison) without consent via a syringe directly into a person’s body'. She also worked with Universities UK to create guidance to support universities' responses to spiking.

== Bibliography ==
=== Rape and Sexual Violence ===
- Walling-Wefelmeyer, R., Johnson, K., Westmarland, N., Dhir, A., & Lyons Sumroy, A. (2023). Teaching for social change: introducing ‘scrapbooking’ as a pedagogic approach towards ending gender-based violence. Journal of Gender-Based Violence, 7(1), 128-145. https://doi.org/10.1332/239868021x16661126604534
- McGlynn, C., & Westmarland, N. (2019). Kaleidoscopic Justice: Sexual Violence and Victim-Survivors’ Perceptions of Justice. Social and Legal Studies, 28(2), 179-201. https://doi.org/10.1177/0964663918761200
- Bows, H., & Westmarland, N. (2018). Older sex offenders – managing risk in the community from a policing perspective. Policing and Society, 28(1), 62-74. https://doi.org/10.1080/10439463.2016.1138476
- Bows, H., & Westmarland, N. (2017). Rape of Older People In The United Kingdom: Challenging The ‘Real Rape’ Stereotype. British Journal of Criminology, 57(1), 1-17. https://doi.org/10.1093/bjc/azv116
- Westmarland, Nicole (2015). Violence against women: criminological perspectives on men's violences. London New York: Routledge, Taylor & Francis Group. ISBN 9781315768830.
- Downes, J., Kelly, L., & Westmarland, N. (2014). Ethics in Violence and Abuse Research - a Positive Empowerment Approach. Sociological Research Online, 19(1). https://doi.org/10.5153/sro.3140
- Westmarland, Nicole; Alderson, Sue; Kirkham, Lizzy (2012). The health, mental health and well-being benefits of Rape Crisis counselling (PDF). Durham: Durham University and Northern Rock Foundation.

See also: Westmarland, Nicole; Alderson, Sue (November 2013). "The health, mental health, and well-being benefits of rape crisis counseling" (PDF). Journal of Interpersonal Violence. 28 (17): 891–920. doi:10.1177/0886260513496899. PMID 23926218. S2CID 206563232.

- Westmarland, Nicole; Brown, Jennifer (2012). Women's views on the policing of rape, domestic violence and stalking within the Cleveland Police area (PDF) (Report). Durham: Durham University and Northern Rock Foundation.
- McGlynn, Clare; Westmarland, Nicole; Godden, Nikki (June 2012). ""I just wanted him to hear me": sexual violence and the possibilities of restorative justice" (PDF). Journal of Law and Society. 39 (2): 213–240. doi:10.1111/j.1467-6478.2012.00579.x. S2CID 143072238.
- Westmarland, Nicole; Gangoli, Geetanjali (2011). International approaches to rape. Bristol: The Policy Press. ISBN 9781847426215.
- Westmarland, Nicole; Gangoli, Geetanjali (2011), "Introduction: Approaches to rape", in Westmarland, Nicole; Gangoli, Geetanjali, eds. (4 April 2012). International Approaches to Rape. Bristol: The Policy Press. pp. 1–11. ISBN 9781847426215.
- Westmarland, Nicole (2011), "Still little justice for rape victim survivors: The void between policy and practice in England and Wales", in Westmarland, Nicole; Gangoli, Geetanjali, eds. (4 April 2012). International Approaches to Rape. Bristol: The Policy Press. pp. 79–100. ISBN 9781847426215.
- Westmarland, Nicole; Graham, Laura (2010). "The promotion and resistance of rape myths in an internet discussion forum" (PDF). Journal of Social Criminology. 1 (2): 80–104. ISSN 2009-2784.
- Brown, Jennifer; Horvath, Miranda; Kelly, Liz; Westmarland, Nicole (2010). Connections and disconnections: Assessing evidence, knowledge and practice in responses to rape (PDF) (Report). London: Government Equalities Office.
- Brown, Jennifer; Horvath, Miranda; Kelly, Liz; Westmarland, Nicole (2010). Has anything changed? Results of a comparative study (1977–2010) on opinions of rape (PDF) (Report). London: Government Equalities Office.
- Westmarland, Nicole (10 July 2008). "Rape's a real crime". New Statesman.
- Westmarland, Nicole (8 March 2008). "The Rape Crisis crisis". New Statesman.

=== Domestic Violence ===
- Miao, L., & Westmarland, N. (2026). "Moms’ Boys," "Phoenix Men," "Soft Rice Men," and "Puxin Men": The Application of Chinese Masculinities to Domestic Violence Perpetrators. Journal of Interpersonal Violence. Advance online publication. https://doi.org/10.1177/08862605261432529
- Miao, L., & Westmarland, N. (2025). ‘There are too many women with love brains’: Domestic Violence and Victim Blaming in China. Journal of Gender-Based Violence. Advance online publication. https://doi.org/10.1332/23986808Y2025D000000073
- Bellini, R., & Westmarland, N. (2023). “We adapted because we had to.” How domestic violence perpetrator programmes adapted to work under COVID-19 in the UK, the USA and Australia. Journal of Aggression, Conflict and Peace Research, 15(3), 205-215. https://doi.org/10.1108/jacpr-05-2022-0716
- Rutter, N., Hall, K., & Westmarland, N. (2023). Responding to Child and Adolescent to Parent Violence and Abuse from a Distance: Remote Delivery of Interventions during Covid-19. Children & Society, 37(3), 705-721. https://doi.org/10.1111/chso.12622
- Myhill, A., Johnson, K., McNeill, A., Critchfield, E., & Westmarland, N. (2022). ‘A genuine one usually sticks out a mile’: policing coercive control in England and Wales. Policing and Society, 33(4), 398-413. https://doi.org/10.1080/10439463.2022.2134370
- Bellini, R., & Westmarland, N. (2021). A problem solved is a problem created: the opportunities and challenges associated with an online domestic violence perpetrator programme. Journal of Gender-Based Violence, 5(3), 499-515. https://doi.org/10.1332/239868021x16171870951258
- Westmarland, N., McGlynn, C., & Humphreys, C. (2018). Using restorative justice approaches to police domestic violence and abuse. Journal of Gender-Based Violence, 2(2), 339-358. https://doi.org/10.1332/239868018x15266373253417
- McGlynn, C., Westmarland, N., & Johnson, K. (2018). Under the radar: the widespread use of ’Out of Court resolutions’ in policing domestic violence and abuse in the United Kingdom. British Journal of Criminology, 58(1), 1-16. https://doi.org/10.1093/bjc/azx004
- Wistow, R., Kelly, L., & Westmarland, N. (2017). ‘Time out’: a strategy for reducing men’s violence against women in relationships? Violence Against Women, 23(6), 730-748. https://doi.org/10.1177/1077801216647944
- Kelly, L., & Westmarland, N. (2016). Naming and defining ‘Domestic Violence’: lessons from research with violent men. Feminist Review, 112(1), 113-127. https://doi.org/10.1057/fr.2015.52
- Westmarland, Nicole; Kelly, Liz (2015), "New approaches to assessing effectiveness and outcomes of domestic violence perpetrator programs", in Johnson, Holly; Fisher, Bonnie S.; Jaquier, Véronique (eds.), Critical issues on violence against women: international perspectives and promising strategies, London: Routledge, pp. 183–194, ISBN 9781135006037.
- Westmarland, Nicole; Kelly, Liz (September 2013). "Why extending measurements of 'success' in domestic violence perpetrator programmes matters for social work". The British Journal of Social Work. 43 (6): 1092–1110. doi:10.1093/bjsw/bcs049.
- Westmarland, Nicole; Kelly, Liz; Chalder-Mills, Julie (2010). Domestic violence perpetrator programmes: What counts as success? (PDF) (Report). London: Respect.
- Hester, Marianne; Westmarland, Nicole; Pearce, Julia; Williamson, Emma (2008). Early evaluation of the Domestic Violence, Crime and Victims Act 2004 (PDF) (Report). London: Ministry of Justice. Archived from the original (PDF) on 15 September 2008.
- Hester, Marianne; Westmarland, Nicole (2005). Tackling domestic violence: Effective interventions and approaches (PDF) (Report). London: Home Office. Archived from the original (PDF) on 18 February 2011.

=== Prostitution ===
- Westmarland, Nicole; Gangoli, Geetanjali, eds. (2006). International Approaches to Prostitution: Law and Policy in Europe and Asia. Bristol: The Policy Press. ISBN 9781861346728.
- Westmarland, Nicole; Gangoli, Geetanjali (2006), "Introduction: Approaches to prostitution", in Westmarland, Nicole; Gangoli, Geetanjali, eds. (31 May 2006). International Approaches to Prostitution: Law and Policy in Europe and Asia. Bristol: The Policy Press. pp. 1–17. ISBN 9781861346728.
- Westmarland, Nicole (2006), "From the personal to the political – Shifting perspectives on street prostitution in England and Wales", in Westmarland, Nicole; Gangoli, Geetanjali, eds. (31 May 2006). International Approaches to Prostitution: Law and Policy in Europe and Asia. Bristol: The Policy Press. pp. 21–43. ISBN 9781861346728.
- Westmarland, Nicole; Hester, Marianne (July 2004). Tackling street prostitution: Towards an holistic approach (PDF) (Report). London: Home Office. Archived from the original (PDF) on 18 February 2011.

=== Men and Boys ===
- Westmarland, N., Almqvist, A., Egeberg Holmgren, L., Ruxton, S., Burrell, S., & Delgado Valbuena, C. (2021). Men’s Activism to End Violence Against Women: Voices from Spain, Sweden and the UK. Policy Press. https://doi.org/10.47674/9781447357971
- Westmarland, N., & Burrell, S. R. (2025). ‘I’m a red-blooded male’: Understanding men’s experiences of domestic abuse through a feminist lens. Criminology & Criminal Justice, 25(5), 1612-1628. https://doi.org/10.1177/17488958231210985
- Downes, N., Kelly, L., & Westmarland, N. (2019). ‘It’s a work in progress’: men’s accounts of gender and change in their use of coercive control. Journal of Gender-Based Violence, 3(3), 267-282. https://doi.org/10.1332/239868019x15627570242850

=== Spiking ===
- Westmarland, N., & McCarry, M. (2025). Searching for a needle in a haystack? An exploratory study into the policing of ‘needle spiking’ in the UK. Policing and Society. Advance online publication. https://doi.org/10.1080/10439463.2025.2462742

== See also ==
- Rape Crisis England & Wales
- Women's Aid Federation of England
