= Audrey Mullender =

British academic administrator

Audrey Mullender FAcSS FRSA

Academic background
- Education: University of Warwick

Academic work
- Institutions: Ruskin College, Oxford
- Main interests: Social work
- Notable works: Children Living with Domestic Violence

Audrey Mullender is a British academic who was Principal of Ruskin College, Oxford, from April 2004 to November 2013.

== Education ==
Mullender was educated at the University of Sheffield, as well as the University of Bordeaux, University of Nottingham, and the University of Warwick, where she obtained a PhD and a DLitt.

== Career ==
From 1996 to 2004, she was Professor of Social Work and chair of the School of Health and Social Studies and the Faculty of Social Studies and director of the Centre for the Study of Safety and Well-being at the University of Warwick.

She is a prolific writer, with more than 120 publications in the social work field, including 20 books. She is a member of the Academy of Social Sciences, a Fellow of the Royal Society of Arts, and was Vice-Chair of the Social Policy and Social Work Sub-Panel in the last Research Assessment Exercise.

Mullender has carried out research on domestic violence, post-adoption issues, and group work theory.

While Principal of Ruskin College, Mullender took the controversial decision to destroy parts of the college's archives. While she took significant criticism for her decision, Mullender asserted that the College was legally required to dispose of the records because they contained personally identifying information.

== Publications ==
=== Books ===
- Mullender, Audrey; Rebecca Morley (1994). Children Living with Domestic Violence: putting men's abuse of women on the child care agenda. London Concord, Massachusetts: Whiting & Birch. ISBN 9781871177725.
- Mullender, Audrey; Thangam Debbonaire (2000). Child Protection and Domestic Violence. Birmingham: Venture Press. ISBN 9781861780423.
- Mullender, Audrey; Liz Kelly; Gill Hague (2001). Challenging Violence Against Women: the Canadian experience. Bristol, UK: Policy Press. ISBN 9781861342782.
- Mullender, Audrey; Liz Kelly; Linda Regan; Gill Hague; Umme Imam; Ellen Malos (2002). Children's Perspectives on Domestic Violence. London: SAGE. ISBN 9780761971061.
- Mullender, Audrey (2002). Rethinking Domestic Violence: the social work and probation response. London: Routledge. ISBN 9781134894574.
- Mullender, Audrey; Dave Ward; Jennie Fleming (2013). Empowerment in Action: self-directed groupwork. Basingstoke, Hampshire: Palgrave Macmillan. ISBN 9780230298170.

=== Journal articles ===
- Mullender, Audrey; Thangam Debbonaire; Liz Kelly; Gill Hague; Ellen Malos (May 1998). "Working with children in women's refuges". Child & Family Social Work. 3 (2): 87–98. doi:10.1046/j.1365-2206.1998.00074.x.
- Mullender, Audrey; Liz Kelly; Gill Hague; Umme Imam; Ellen Malos (January 2002). "How do children understand and cope with domestic violence?". Practice. 14 (1): 17–26. doi:10.1080/09503150208414289. S2CID 57355820.
