= Ann Buchanan (academic) =

British sociologist (1941–2022)

Ann Buchanan MBE
- Born: Ann Hermione Baring; 21 May 1941; Winchester, England
- Died: 13 February 2022 (aged 80) near Scotland
- Spouse: Alistair John Buchanan
- Children: 3

Academic background
- Education: University of Bath; University of Southampton

Academic work
- Institutions: University of Oxford (St Hilda's)
- Doctoral students: Heidi Stöckl

Ann Hermione Buchanan, MBE, FASC (née Baring, 21 May 1941 – 13 February 2022) was a British researcher, author and academic. She was Senior Research Associate in the Department of Social Policy and Intervention and Professor Emeritus of Social Work at Oxford University. She was also a Supernumerary Fellow of St. Hilda's College since 1994.

Buchanan's research was focused on studies on children who were looked after, child protection, the impact of divorce, fathering, grandparenting, child-well-being and children at risk of exclusion.

Buchanan was awarded the MBE in 2012 for services to Social Science. She was a Fellow of the Academy of Social Science.

== Early life and education ==
Buchanan was born in Winchester on 21 May 1941 to father Raymond Alexander Baring, whom she did not meet until after he returned from fighting in World War II, and mother Margaret Fleetwood Campbell-Preston. She was sister of the 3rd, paternal niece of the 2nd and paternal granddaughter of the 1st Baring Baronets, of Nubia House. During the war, the women and children of the family went to live with Buchanan's maternal grandmother at Ardchattan Priory, Scotland before returning to Hampshire, settling in Bramley. Buchanan attended St Mary's School, Wantage.

After leaving school, Buchanan took secretarial classes and found a job at an agency in London. She temporarily relocated to New York, staying with her cousin while working in advertising for Vogue. She went traveling with photojournalist Jill Krementz before returning to London.

On 20 July 1963, Buchanan married as his second wife Alistair John Buchanan, son of John James Buchanan and wife, Managing Director of Morgan Grenfell Securities, of whom she had three daughters: Catherine Anne Louise Buchanan on 9 November 1963, Teresa Margaret Buchanan on 10 September 1967 and Helen Hermione Buchanan in 1973.

Deciding to go into social work, Buchanan resat her English A Level and began studying at a London university, but relocated to Great Bedwyn for health reasons. She persuaded the University of Bath to allow her to pursue a Postgraduate Diploma in Social Studies, which she completed in 1968. In 1990, Buchanan received a Ph.D. in Social Work and Psychology from the University of Southampton.

== Career ==
In 1974, Buchanan joined Burderop Hospitals as a Research Assistant to Jack Oliver. She left Burderop Hospitals in 1980 to become a child psychiatric social worker. In 1989 she was appointed a Lecturer at University of Southampton. In 1994, she joined University of Oxford as Lecturer. She was promoted to Professor in 2006. At Oxford she set up the Centre for Research into Parenting and Children at Oxford in 1996 with partners from across the university, with a particular focus on children who were at risk of social exclusion. She served as its Director from 1996 to 2008. She was appointed to the Council of ESRC in 2006 and chaired the Research Ethics Committee and Evaluation Board from 2007 to 2013 and then served on the Council of the National Academy of Social Sciences from 2011 to 2017, serving on their Audit Committee and Publication Committees.

Buchanan was a Trustee of Family Welfare Association from 1999 to 2007, The Baring Foundation from 2002 to 2014; Grandparents Plus from 2012 to 2018 and Oxfordshire Community Foundation from 2004 to 2014.

=== Research ===
In 1973, Buchanan worked with Jack Oliver on his studies of severely abusing families – with one family they traced back 7 generations. With his help, she wrote her first book Intergenerational Child Maltreatment: Facts, Fancies and Interventions. They also undertook a study on children in subnormality hospital who had been rendered disabled as a result of child abuse.

As severely abused children ended up in public care, as a social worker, Buchanan was interested in what happened to those children brought up by the public parent. She wrote several papers on this topic. Later at Oxford, Buchanan broadened her research to include all children. For these studies, she used the National Child Development Study (NCDS). Her research on what happened when these children grew up showed that children brought up in care had major mental health and other problems when adult. Two issues emerged from her NCDS work: first, the impact of divorce on children’s outcomes and second, the important role of fathers. This led to studies funded by Nuffield Foundation on divorce and ESRC on fathers. The work on divorce was also influential highlighting court cases where parents were fighting over the custody of children.

By this point, the focus of Buchanan's research was moving onto how to promote child well-being and supportive family relationships. She conducted research on the issues that went wrong in family relationships. Her Centre at Oxford ran seminars every year on ‘Promoting the well-being of children’; two edited volumes emerged from this work. She continued her work on fathering but also began focusing on the impact of grandparents in a child's life. Subsequently, she edited a volume on the role of grandfathers.

In 2013, she co-edited the book Fertility Rates and Population Decline: No Time for Children? with Anna Rotkirch. She then edited the 2016 book, Grandfathers: Global Perspectives with Rotkirch. The book was nominated for a British Academy Peter Townsend award. In 2018, she and Rotkirch edited the book The Role of Grandparents in the 21st Century: Global Perspectives on Changing Roles and Consequences. Her former doctoral students include Heidi Stöckl.

== Personal life and death ==
Buchanan lived at Hill Barn, Great Bedwyn, Wiltshire, in 2003. She died in her sleep whilst onboard a cruise to see the northern lights, off the Scotland, on 13 February 2022, aged 80.

== Awards and honours ==
- 2009 - Fellow of the Academy of Social Science
- 2012 - MBE for services to Social Science
- 2013 - Honorary LLD, University of Bath
