= Thangam Debbonaire =

British politician (born 1966)

The Right Honourable The Baroness Debbonaire
- Official portrait, 2026

Shadow Secretary of State for Culture, Media and Sport
- In office 4 September 2023 – 5 July 2024
- Leader: Keir Starmer
- Preceded by: Lucy Powell
- Succeeded by: Julia Lopez

Shadow Leader of the House of Commons
- In office 9 May 2021 – 4 September 2023
- Leader: Keir Starmer
- Preceded by: Valerie Vaz
- Succeeded by: Lucy Powell

Shadow Secretary of State for Housing
- In office 6 April 2020 – 9 May 2021
- Leader: Keir Starmer
- Preceded by: John Healey
- Succeeded by: Lucy Powell

Shadow Minister for Exiting the European Union
- In office 7 January 2020 – 4 April 2020
- Leader: Jeremy Corbyn
- Preceded by: Jenny Chapman
- Succeeded by: Position abolished

Shadow Minister for Arts and Heritage
- In office 14 January 2016 – 27 June 2016
- Leader: Jeremy Corbyn
- Preceded by: Position established
- Succeeded by: Kevin Brennan

Member of the House of Lords
- Lord Temporal
- Life peerage 7 February 2025

Member of Parliament for Bristol West
- In office 7 May 2015 – 30 May 2024
- Preceded by: Stephen Williams
- Succeeded by: Constituency abolished

Personal details
- Born: Thangam Elizabeth Rachel Singh; 3 August 1966 (age 60) Peterborough, England
- Party: Labour
- Spouse: Kevin Walton
- Education: University of Oxford (attended); Royal College of Music (ARCM); St. John's City College of Technology, Manchester (BSc); University of Bristol (MSc)
- Website: Official website

Thangam Elizabeth Rachel Debbonaire, Baroness Debbonaire (née Singh; born 3 August 1966) is a British politician who was the Member of Parliament (MP) for Bristol West between 2015 and 2024, and made a life peer in the House of Lords shortly after. A member of the Labour Party, she served as Shadow Secretary of State for Culture, Media and Sport from 2023 until 2024. She was previously Shadow Secretary of State for Housing from 2020 to 2021 and Shadow Leader of the House of Commons from 2021 to 2023.

Debbonaire was appointed shadow Arts and Culture Minister in January 2016, but resigned the following June owing to her lack of confidence in Labour Party leader Jeremy Corbyn. She rejoined his frontbench team as a whip in October that year, before being made Shadow Brexit Minister in January 2020.

In the 2024 general election, Debbonaire ran in Bristol Central (which largely replaced Bristol West following the 2023 Periodic Review of Westminster constituencies) but lost to Carla Denyer of the Green Party. In December that year, she was elevated to the Lords as Baroness Debbonaire, where she sits as a Labour peer.

== Early life and education ==
Thangam Singh was born on 3 August 1966 in Peterborough to a father of Indian and Tamil family origin and an English mother. She was educated at two private schools, Bradford Girls' Grammar School and Chetham's School of Music. She then took the first stage of a mathematics degree at the University of Oxford, leaving before graduating, while at the same time training as a cellist at the Royal College of Music. She went to St John's City College of Technology, Manchester and subsequently gained an MSc in Management, Development and Social Responsibility at the University of Bristol.

In her twenties, she changed her surname by deed poll from Singh to Debbonaire, borrowed from a relative from her first marriage.

== Career ==
Before becoming an MP, Debbonaire performed professionally as a classical cellist. She has worked as National Children's Officer for the Women's Aid Federation of England, for which she moved to St Werburghs in Bristol in 1991, and later as an Accreditation Officer, Fundraising Manager, then National Research Manager for Respect, an anti-domestic violence organisation.

She has co-authored two books, and a number of papers, about domestic violence. In 2004, Debbonaire and her husband, Kevin Walton, co-authored (along with Emilie Debbonaire) a report for Ireland's Department of Justice, Equality and Law Reform entitled Evaluation of work with domestic abusers in Ireland.

== Parliamentary career ==
=== House of Commons ===
==== 2015–2017 Parliament ====
At the 2015 general election, Debbonaire was elected to Parliament as MP for Bristol West with 35.7% of the vote and a majority of 5,673.

In December 2015, shortly after being elected, Debbonaire was diagnosed with breast cancer, and did not attend a parliamentary vote from June 2015 until March 2016. She subsequently called on Parliament to allow MPs to vote remotely after she was unable to participate in votes during her recovery.

During her treatment period she was appointed as Shadow Arts and Culture Minister by Jeremy Corbyn. According to Debbonaire, she found out about the role when a journalist contacted her in hospital in response to a Labour press release announcing that she was taking it on, and was then briefly removed from the position before she got a chance to meet with Corbyn. According to Debbonaire's colleague Chi Onwurah, whose frontbench portfolio was briefly split with hers, Corbyn's communication with both women, directly or indirectly, was practically non-existent.

Debbonaire resigned from her role on 27 June 2016 following a series of other resignations, saying that she did not believe Corbyn was the right person to lead the Labour Party into the next election. She also opposed Corbyn's call for Article 50 to be triggered on the day immediately following the referendum on the European Union. Her resignation attracted criticism in her Constituency Labour Party (CLP), with some members accusing her of being a liar, a "traitor", and a "scab".

Debbonaire endorsed Owen Smith in the 2016 Labour leadership election. After Corbyn defeated Smith, on 12 October 2016, Debbonaire accepted an appointment as a shadow whip in Corbyn's frontbench team.

==== 2017–2019 Parliament ====
At the snap 2017 general election, Debbonaire was re-elected as MP for Bristol West with an increased vote share of 65.9% and an increased majority of 37,336.

On 15 September 2017, Debbonaire held what was thought to be the UK's first constituency surgery specifically for people on the autism spectrum. In the same month, she urged local constituency members discontented about her resignation to stop planning her deselection, which she claimed was "a catastrophic waste of time".

==== 2019–2024 Parliament ====
Debbonaire was again re-elected at the 2019 general election, with a decreased vote share of 62.3% and a decreased majority of 28,219.

On 9 May 2021, Debbonaire was moved from the post of Shadow Secretary of State for Housing to Shadow Leader of the House of Commons in a shadow cabinet reshuffle. On 4 September 2023 she was appointed Shadow Secretary of State for Culture, Media and Sport by Keir Starmer despite admitting she had never been to a football or rugby match before.

Due to the 2023 Periodic Review of Westminster constituencies, Debbonaire's constituency of Bristol West was abolished, and replaced with Bristol Central. In January 2022, Debbonaire was selected as the Labour candidate for Bristol Central at the 2024 general election.

The Guardian reported that she could be considered for a position in the House of Lords if she were to lose her seat in the election. Politico reported that Green party campaigners were being advised to tell voters that if Debbonaire "doesn’t get elected they’re going to put her in the Lords anyway". Debbonaire was "enraged" and insisted that there had been no discussions about a peerage with the Labour leadership.

In the 2024 United Kingdom general election, Debbonaire contested the newly created Bristol Central but lost her re-election bid to Carla Denyer of the Green Party. Following the election, she stated on Channel 4 that she was expecting to lose her seat as early as November 2023, when she voted against calling for a ceasefire in the Israel-Hamas war.

=== House of Lords ===
In December 2024, it was announced that Debbonaire had been nominated for a life peerage as part of the 2024 Political Peerages. On 7 February 2025, she was created Baroness Debbonaire, of De Beauvoir Town in the London Borough of Hackney. Her territorial designation is for the De Beauvoir Town neighbourhood in East London.

== Political views ==
Debbonaire describes herself as a "northern European socialist – a democratic socialist". She has also said that she supports "fettered capitalism".

Debbonaire opposes the decriminalisation of prostitution and has called on Bristol City Council to stop issuing licences to strip clubs in the city. She has called for more funding and research to help reform male perpetrators of domestic violence. She supports mandatory education classes in female equality for newly arrived male refugees, as well as more English language support for refugees as part of a broader integration strategy.

Debbonaire has also called for student accommodation providers to pay council tax. She has supported removal of the Statue of Edward Colston in Bristol.

She has opposed MPs holding second jobs.

=== Brexit ===
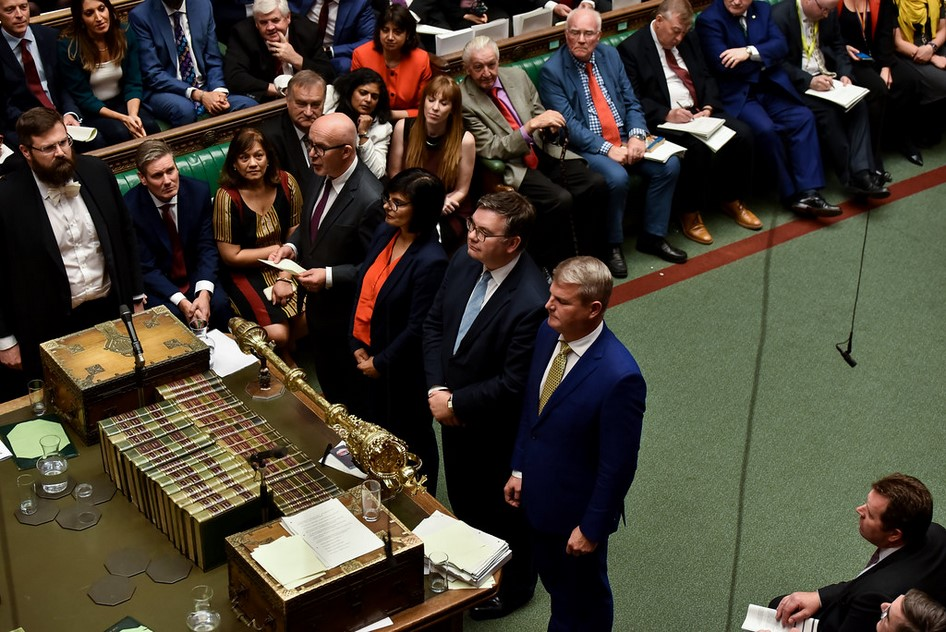
Debbonaire acts as teller on a Brexit vote

Before the 2016 Brexit referendum, Debbonaire endorsed remaining in the EU. Her constituency of Bristol West voted to remain in the European Union by 79.3%; this was the third-highest percentage result for the Remain campaign by parliamentary constituency.

On 27 January 2017, Debbonaire stated that she would vote against triggering Article 50, despite being a whip herself and Labour imposing a three-line whip to vote for the government motion. She said that this was because the government intended to leave "the Single Market or something close to it". On 29 June 2017, Debbonaire abstained from voting in an amendment by Chuka Umunna to the Queen's Speech which would have kept the UK in the Single Market and held a vote on the final Brexit deal; her abstention was criticised by Molly Scott Cato, the local Green Party candidate in the 2017 general election. Debbonaire defended her abstention, stating that she had supported a similar amendment drafted by Labour. She said: "I will do everything I can to stop the UK from leaving the EU".

In December 2017, Debbonaire criticised the quality of the Brexit impact papers published by David Davis, then the Brexit Secretary. She stated that the sectoral analyses "wouldn't get an A grade...if [the government] were submitting it as GCSE research" and believed that the papers only compiled information already publicly available. She accused the government of "a dereliction of duty".

In July 2018, Debbonaire said that she did not support a referendum on the Brexit deal. She was criticised by Vince Cable, the leader of the Liberal Democrats. In response, Debbonaire said that there was insufficient public support for a final vote on the deal, and she accused the Liberal Democrats of "playing politics" on the issue.

=== Drugs reform ===
Debbonaire's treatment for breast cancer led her to support greater regulation of alcohol. She supports mandatory graphic health warnings on alcoholic drinks, akin to those on cigarette packaging, and has called for parliamentary debate to raise awareness of the link between alcohol and cancer.

Debbonaire has previously called for an “evidence-based policy review” of the laws around drugs such as ecstasy and marijuana. She supports sending addicted users to mandatory rehabilitation programmes. Debbonaire has also voiced support for "drug consumption rooms", telling ministers that drug-related admissions to Bristol Royal Infirmary cost the NHS £1.3 million per year. On 10 July 2018, Debbonaire co-launched a campaign for drugs policy reform alongside fellow Labour whip Jeff Smith. The campaign was launched without policy proposals, intended as a forum for Labour members to discuss drugs policy reform. Shortly after launching the campaign, Debbonaire called for drug-testing services to be made compulsory at festivals and nightclubs across the UK. She had previously called for a Royal Commission to investigate the impact of drugs and had called for the Prime Minister to watch Drugsland, a BBC documentary on drugs in Bristol.

== Post-parliamentary career ==
Following her defeat at the 2024 UK General Election, Debbonaire was appointed as Senior Policy Adviser for UKAI, FGS Global and Forward Global.

== Personal life ==
Debbonaire is married to Kevin Walton, an opera singer, former actor and a director of Ark Stichting, an Amsterdam charity that works with children with special educational needs.

Debbonaire cites music, knitting and observing space as her hobbies. She has described herself as a "big fan" of the new wave band Talking Heads. During her treatment for breast cancer, she credited listening to classical music with helping her recovery. Since her breast cancer treatment, during which time she read about the links between cancer and alcohol, Debbonaire stopped drinking alcohol and transitioned to a vegan diet. Since then, she has said her diet had become more relaxed, and is no longer vegan or teetotal. Debbonaire spent a month in 2017 attempting to live without single-use plastics.

=== Harassment ===
In August 2016, a student at the University of Bristol was investigated after telling Debbonaire to "get in the sea", an Internet meme, which she interpreted as a literal death threat. Following a complaint to the university by Debbonaire concerning that tweet and others, including one which called her a "traitor", the student apologised, deleted the tweet, and closed her Twitter account. The tweet was posted on the day of the funeral of Jo Cox, another Labour MP, who was murdered in June 2016.

In November 2017, a constituent who harassed Debbonaire was jailed for 20 weeks after leaving multiple "upsetting and disturbing" racially offensive answerphone messages for a senior case worker.

== Bibliography ==
Books

- Mullender, Audrey; Thangam Debbonaire (2000). Child Protection and Domestic Violence. Birmingham: Venture Press. ISBN 9781861780423.

Chapters in books

- Debbonaire, Thangam (1994), "Children in refuges", in Mullender, Audrey; Morley, Rebecca (eds.), Children living with domestic violence: putting men's abuse of women on the child care agenda, London Concord, Massachusetts: Whiting & Birch, ISBN 9781871177725.

Journal articles

- Mullender, Audrey; Thangam Debbonaire; Liz Kelly; Gill Hague; Ellen Malos (May 1998). "Working with children in women's refuges". Child & Family Social Work. 3 (2): 87–98. doi:10.1046/j.1365-2206.1998.00074.x.

Papers

- Debbonaire, Thangam; Debbonaire, Emilie; Walton, Kevin (2004). Evaluation of work with domestic abusers in Ireland. Dublin: Department of Justice, Equality and Law Reform. OCLC 65202770.
- Debbonaire, Thangam (2008). Respect position statement (with research review) on gender and domestic violence. London: Respect.
- Debbonaire, Thangam (2015). Responding to diverse ethnic communities in domestic violence perpetrator programmes (PDF). London: Respect.

Parliament of the United Kingdom
Preceded by Stephen Williams	Member of Parliament for Bristol West; 2015–2024	Succeeded by Carla Denyer
Political offices
Preceded by Valerie Vaz	Shadow Leader of the House of Commons; 2021–2023	Succeeded by Lucy Powell
Preceded by Lucy Powell	Shadow Secretary of State for Culture, Media and Sport; 2023–2024	Succeeded by Julia Lopez
