= Heidi Stöckl =

German sociologist and researcher

- Education: University of Oxford; LMU Munich; Free University of Berlin
- Awards: Rhodes Scholarship
- Scientific career
- Fields: Social epidemiology Violence against women Girls and children Young people
- Workplaces: London School of Hygiene and Tropical Medicine
- Thesis: Partner violence during pregnancy and its risk and protective factors in Germany (2009)
- Doctoral advisor: Ann Buchanan
- Website: ihrs.ibe.med.uni-muenchen.de/team/leitung/stoeckl_heidi

Heidi Stöckl is a German researcher, public health researcher, political scientist and sociologist at LMU Munich. Her research investigates violence against women and girls, homicide and human trafficking. She has previously worked at the London School of Hygiene and Tropical Medicine and collaborated with the World Health Organization on the design and implementation of strategies to end violence against women.

== Early life and education ==
Stöckl was born in Germany and was an undergraduate student at LMU Munich, where she studied political sciences. She moved to the Free University of Berlin, where she completed a diploma in political science. Stöckl studied sociology at Nuffield College, University of Oxford. She was awarded a Rhodes Scholarship to complete her doctoral research on evidence-based social intervention with Frances Gardner and Ann Buchanan. During her doctorate, she studied the epidemiology of intimate partner violence amongst pregnant women in Germany.

== Research and career ==
Stöckl was awarded a British Academy postdoctoral fellowship at the London School of Hygiene and Tropical Medicine.

Stöckl became a lecturer in the Gender Violence and Health Centre at the London School of Hygiene and Tropical Medicine. She was made Director of the Gender Violence and Health Centres in 2017. Her research considered violence against women and girls. In 2021, she moved to LMU Munich.

=== Selected publications ===
- Heidi Stöckl; Karen Devries; Alexandra Rotstein; Naeemah Abrahams; Jacquelyn Campbell; Charlotte Watts; Claudia Garcia Moreno (20 June 2013). "The global prevalence of intimate partner homicide: a systematic review". The Lancet. 382 (9895): 859–865. doi:10.1016/s0140-6736(13)61030-2. ISSN 0140-6736. PMID 23791474. Wikidata Q38116233.
- Heidi Stöckl; Laura March; Christina Pallitto; Claudia Garcia-Moreno; WHO Multi-country Study Team (25 July 2014). "Intimate partner violence among adolescents and young women: prevalence and associated factors in nine countries: a cross-sectional study". BMC Public Health. 14: 751. doi:10.1186/1471-2458-14-751. ISSN 1471-2458. PMC 4133076. PMID 25059423. Wikidata Q34045950.
- Karen M Devries; Sunita Kishor; Holly Johnson; Heidi Stöckl; Loraine J Bacchus; Claudia Garcia-Moreno; Charlotte Watts (1 November 2010). "Intimate partner violence during pregnancy: analysis of prevalence data from 19 countries". Sexual and Reproductive Health Matters. 18 (36): 158–170. doi:10.1016/s0968-8080(10)36533-5. ISSN 0968-8080. PMID 21111360. Wikidata Q33756967.
