= Tender (charity) =

British charity opposing domestic and sexual violence

Tender (formerly Until the Violence Stops) is a London-based charitable organisation that works to prevent domestic violence. Founded in 2003, Tender delivers educational violence prevention programmes to secondary schools, Pupil Referral Units (PRUs) and youth centres throughout Greater London.

== Mission ==
Tender promotes healthy relationships based on equality and respect by inviting all men, women and especially young people to actively prevent domestic abuse and sexual violence.

Tender aims to:

1. enable young people (5 to 25 years old) to develop positive attitudes towards relationships in order to prevent domestic abuse and sexual violence
2. equip adults with the skills and resources they need to promote healthy relationships amongst young people

== History ==
Tender was formerly known as Until the Violence Stops (UTVS), the UK arm of the V-Day campaign.

Tender's main work is the TRUST Education Project. TRUST was developed out of the work of Tender's founding director and education manager that was commissioned by the South Essex Rape and Incest Crisis Centre (SERICC) to design a peer education theatre project for the Thurrock RESPECT programme in 2000. RESPECT, created by Zero Tolerance Charitable Trust, has been running since, working to prevent violence in relationships by educating young people about the early warning signs of abuse.

Tender adapted and developed the RESPECT model to work in London schools. With the funding of The Body Shop Foundation, the TRUST Education Project was piloted in April 2004 in 5 secondary schools in the London boroughs: Lambeth, Lewisham, Hammersmith, Newham, and Westminster. The TRUST Education Project has been delivered to 27 boroughs in London since its conception.

CRG Research Limited are currently conducting an independent evaluation of the Trust Education Project.

== About the Trust Education Project ==
The TRUST Education Project aims to enable young men and young women to develop healthy relationships based on respect, trust and equality and to be active citizens in creating communities that do not tolerate domestic abuse and sexual violence. The objective of the project is to change attitudes of tolerance to violence by using drama to explore issues around healthy and unhealthy relationships. Young people create a piece of theatre that represents their understanding and outlook while also educating and informing their audience, peers and local communities. In a 10-week workshop process, students explore issues around respect within relationships, good citizenship and positive communication skills.
