= Charlotte Watts =

British mathematician, epidemiologist, and academic

Charlotte Watts CMG FMedSci
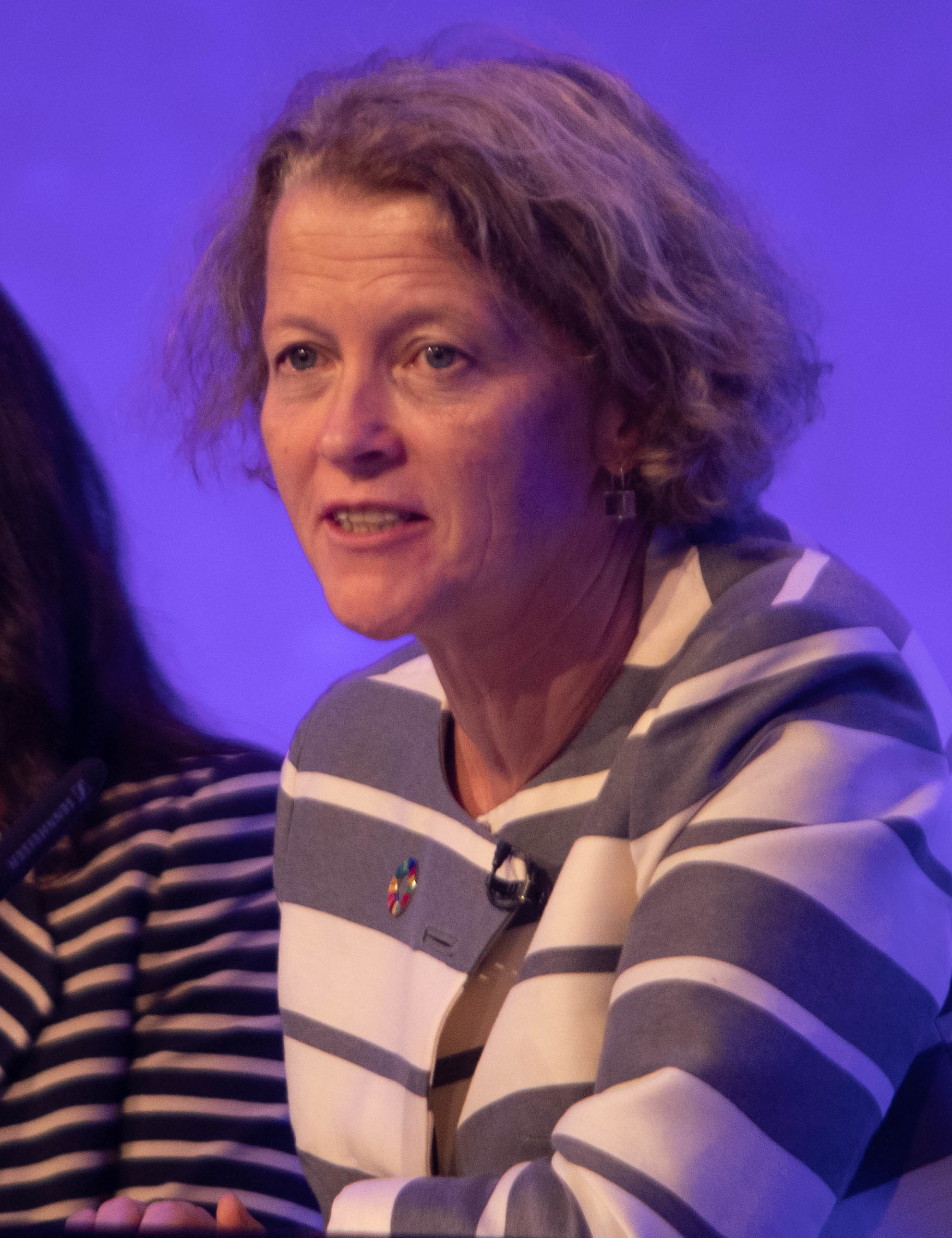
- Professor Charlotte Watts in 2018
- Born: Charlotte Helen Watts; 1962 (age 63–64); Farnborough, England
- Spouse: Chris Carbone
- Children: 2
- Scientific career
- Doctoral students: Cathy Zimmerman
- Website: www.gov.uk/government/people/charlotte-watts

Charlotte Helen Watts (born 1962) is a British mathematician, epidemiologist, and academic. Since 2006, she has been Professor of Social and Mathematical Epidemiology at the London School of Hygiene and Tropical Medicine. She was also the Chief Scientific Advisor to the UK's Department for International Development from 2015 to 2020. Her research interests include HIV and gender-based violence.

== Early life and education ==
Born in Farnborough, Kent, England in 1962, she was educated at Falmouth School, a state school in Cornwall. She studied mathematics and pure mathematics at university. She graduated from Exeter College, Oxford with a Bachelor of Arts (BA) degree in 1984, and from Marlboro College (in Vermont, US) with a Master of Science (MSc) degree in 1986. She then attended the University of Warwick, graduating with a Doctor of Philosophy (PhD) degree in mathematics in 1990: her doctoral thesis concerned the "stochastic stability of diffeomorphisms".

== Career ==
Watts was a Royal Society Postdoctoral Research Fellow at the University of Oxford from 1991 to 1993. She then moved to the London School of Hygiene and Tropical Medicine (LSHTM) as a lecturer in 1994. She was a lecturer at the University of Zimbabwe from 1994 to 1997, before returning to LSHTM. She has been Professor of Social and Mathematical Epidemiology at the London School of Hygiene and Tropical Medicine (LSHTM) since 2006. She was Chief Scientific Advisor to the Department for International Development from 2015 to 2020.

Watts founded the Gender Violence Research Centre at the London School of Hygiene and Tropical Medicine. This team collaborated in 2012 with Liz Kelly and colleagues at the Child and Woman Abuse Studies Unit, London Metropolitan University and Nicole Westmarland and her research team at Durham University's Crime, Violence and Abuse group to assess the impact of community domestic violence perpetrator programmes on women and children's safety, as well as investigating related questions such as which specific factors enable violent men to change their behaviour. The research was supported by Respect, the UK's umbrella organisation for domestic violence perpetrator programmes.

Watts has done field work on gender based violence at the Musasa Project in Zimbabwe. The project is a women's NGO working to address the widespread violence against women in Zimbabwe. Her former doctoral students include Cathy Zimmerman.

=== Other activities ===
- Coalition for Epidemic Preparedness Innovations (CEPI), Member of the Board
- UK Collaborative on Development Research (UKCDR), Member of the Strategic Coherence of ODA-funded Research

== Personal life ==
Watts is married and has two sons.

== Honours and awards ==
In 2015, Watts was elected a Fellow of the Academy of Medical Sciences (FMedSci). In the 2019 Queen's Birthday Honours, she was appointed a Companion of the Order of St Michael and St George (CMG) "for services to global health and international development".

== Selected works ==
- Watts, Charlotte; Zimmerman, Cathy (April 2002). "Violence against women: global scope and magnitude". The Lancet. 359 (9313): 1232–1237. doi:10.1016/S0140-6736(02)08221-1. PMID 11955557. S2CID 38436965.
- García-Moreno, Claudia; Jansen, HAFM; Ellsberg, Mary; Heise, Lori; Watts, Charlotte (2005). WHO multi-country study on women's health and domestic violence against women: initial results on prevalence, health outcomes and women's responses. Geneva: World Health Organization. ISBN 924159358X.
- Pronyk, Paul M; Hargreaves, James R; Kim, Julia C; Morison, Linda A; Phetla, Godfrey; Watts, Charlotte; Busza, Joanna; Porter, John DH (December 2006). "Effect of a structural intervention for the prevention of intimate-partner violence and HIV in rural South Africa: a cluster randomised trial". The Lancet. 368 (9551): 1973–1983. doi:10.1016/S0140-6736(06)69744-4. PMID 17141704. S2CID 14146492.
- Abramsky, Tanya; Watts, Charlotte H; Garcia-Moreno, Claudia; Devries, Karen; Kiss, Ligia; Ellsberg, Mary; Jansen, Henrica AFM; Heise, Lori (16 February 2011). "What factors are associated with recent intimate partner violence? findings from the WHO multi-country study on women's health and domestic violence" (PDF). BMC Public Health. 11 (1): 109. doi:10.1186/1471-2458-11-109. PMC 3049145. PMID 21324186.
- García-Moreno, Claudia; Pallitto, Christina; Devries, Karen; Stöckl, Heidi; Watts, Charlotte; Abrahams, Naeema (2013). Global and regional estimates of violence against women: prevalence and health effects of intimate partner violence and non-partner sexual violence. Geneva: World Health Organization. ISBN 9789241564625.
