= Women Against Violence Europe =

European feminist network dedicated to ending violence against women and children

- Abbreviation: WAVE
- Founded: 1994, Vienna, Austria
- Founders: Niamh Wilson of Women's Aid Ireland Ebon Kram of the Swedish women's shelters networks ROKS Urszula Nowakowska of the Centrum Praw Kobiet in Warsaw Marianne Cense of TransAct in the Netherlands Lepa Mladjenovic of the SOS Hotline in Belgrade Raquel Cadorso of the AMCV Associacao de Mulheres Contra a Violencia Rosa Logar of the Austrian Women's Shelter Network of AOF
- Headquarters: Vienna, Austria
- Services: Protection women's human rights
- Fields: Campaigns, reports, research
- Members: More than 150 members
- Key people: Stephanie Futter-Orel (director)
- Website: https://www.wave-network.org/

Women Against Violence Europe (WAVE) is a non-profit feminist women's organization which was established in 1994 and has its headquarters in Vienna, Austria. It is the only European network focused exclusively on the elimination of violence against women and children, and it lobbies state governments and relevant bodies of the Council of Europe at the EU level to gain sustainability of women's services. In keeping with the aims of the United Nations, WAVE highlights ending all forms of violence against women and children in both public and private life, following documents such as the Vienna Declaration, the Declaration on Violence Against Women and the Beijing Platform for Action.

== Background and history ==
The inspiration for WAVE began in 1993 at the World Conference on Human Rights, which was held in Vienna. The conference explicitly named violence against women as a violation of human rights, which was outlined in the resulting Vienna Declaration. The Declaration defined violence against women, and called for states to take concrete steps to prevent it. Following this, the United Nations General Assembly (UNGA) adopted the Declaration on the Elimination of Violence Against Women in December 1993. In October 1994, women gathered at the Vienna NGO Forum to prepare for the 4th UN Conference on Women in Beijing, where the idea of creating a European network dedicated to eliminating violence against women first emerged. At the Beijing Conference, held from 4 to 15 September 1995, progress was made on forming the network, with initiators running a working group that contributed to the development of the Platform for Action. The WAVE founding group held its constituent session during the World Conference and, in October 1996, WAVE held its first networking session in Utrecht. The group was originally named the "Information Centre Against Violence" before changing its title to "Women Against Violence" and then "Women Against Violence Europe".

The organization's first meeting took place at the Intervention Centre Against Domestic Violence in Vienna in December 1996, and in 1997 WAVE held its first conference in Belgrade, Serbia. WAVE's work has been supported by the European Commission since 1997. In 2014, WAVE became a legal entity in Austria.

== Organization structure ==
=== WAVE Network Members ===
WAVE brings together European women's NGOs working to combat violence against women and children. WAVE currently has over 150 member organizations working at the national level across 46 European countries. Members include networks, individual organizations, and individuals, each represented by a delegate and co-delegate of their choosing.

=== Board members ===
The WAVE board includes up to eight members serving for two years. Pille Tsopp-Pagan served as president from January 2019, followed by Marcella Pirrone (Dire, Italy) from 2020. Since 2023, the President has been Susana Pavlou from Malta.

=== Advisory board members ===
The advisory board supports the Board with strategic advice by raising issues from members' home countries. Its role is to ensure representation from all regions and to help the office work closely with members during biennial meetings. The advisory board is composed of a representative of each country in which WAVE is present.

=== Office ===
The WAVE Office Team serves as a point of contact between the involved women's organizations in Europe. Its main functions include collecting and disseminating data on women's support services (WSS) and applicable legal provisions, creating prevention programmes, campaigns and international activities. The office is involved in advocacy work at the European and national level, producing publications and organizing relevant activities. Marie Rosselbrumer (Austria Shelter network) has been the executive manager from 1997 to 2007. The current executive director is Stephanie Futter-Orel.

== Principles ==
The network's aims are to promote and strengthen the human rights of women and children, specifically by preventing violence against these groups, and to eliminate all forms of violence against women in order to attain gender equality. WAVE pursues these goals by supporting other organizations working for women's rights, particularly those providing direct services to women affected by violence.

=== Main Activities ===
1. Advocacy
2. Capacity building of women's specialist services (WSS)
3. Exchange of information
4. Research
5. Networking

== Key programs/Initiatives ==
=== Step Up! Campaign ===
This is a European-wide WAVE campaign, which is meant to increase efforts to end violence against women, raise awareness of the issue, mobilize for the rights of women and children to live free from violence and protect female survivors of such violence. It recognizes the Istanbul Convention as the most powerful legal tool in Europe to promote its aims and considers knowledge and education key elements to its program's success.

=== The WAVE Youth Ambassadors ===
The WAVE Youth Ambassadors have supported the Step Up! Campaign since October 2018 and are nominated every two years. Their work focuses on raising awareness among young audiences about violence against women and girls. The group typically comprises 10 to 15 young people (aged 18–27) from the participating countries.

=== Civil Society Strengthening Platform (CSSP) ===
CSSP aims to build women's voices and agency at a regional level by increasing the capacity of women's organizations' platforms and networks, supporting women's civic engagement in CEDAW and Istanbul Convention monitoring and reporting. It is part of a 3-year program funded by the European Commission and UN Women called "Implementing Norms, Changing Minds".

=== CYBERSAFE Project ===
The CYBERSAFE project aims to prevent cyber violence against women and girls. Part of the project has involved developing a game to help young people understand the risks associated with online violence. WAVE participates alongside partners from eight EU countries.

=== TISOVA ===
Launched in September 2017, TISOVA is a European Erasmus+ programme that establishes partnerships between senior care centres and participating partner countries. It uses an interactive training programme to educate key groups on violence against older people.

=== WHOSEFVA ===
WHOSEFVA was a two-year project funded by the European Commission under its "Rights, Equality and Citizenship" programme. It aimed to address barriers and gaps in healthcare systems in order to better support older women experiencing or having experienced abuse. The project was implemented across six partner countries.

=== MARVOW ===
MARVOW is a European project comprising six partners and nine associate partners across four countries. It develops a comprehensive multi-agency cooperation model for working with older victims of abuse, including implementation, intervention, and work with perpetrators.

=== DIS.CO ===
DIS.CO was a two-year Erasmus+ programme designed to provide educational and vocational training for counselling professionals working with women victims of violence or abuse through distance learning.

== Funding ==
The WAVE Network is largely funded through an Operating Grant from the European Union, alongside other grants from organisations including the OAK Foundation, UN Women, Open Society Foundation, and the Austrian Federal Ministry for Labour, Social Affairs, Health and Consumer Protection. WAVE also receives income from an annual membership fee.

== Publications ==
Every other year since 2008, WAVE has been publishing the so-called Country Reports. The Country Reports document the situation of women's specialist support services across Europe. As a guideline to measure progress and deficits the standards defined in the Istanbul Convention is being used. The extensive data collection gives insight into the accessibility and operation of national women's helplines, women's shelters, women's centers and specialist services for survivors of sexualized violence in Europe. The country profiles give detailed information about the status of each country of the large majority of European states (46 states). Data is collected by an online questionnaire that fulfill minimum standards for data collection required by the Istanbul Convention. Data are collected directly from WAVE Country Delegates every two years.

Furthermore, WAVE publishes audiovisuals, a bi-monthly newsletter, policy and thematic papers, research reports and training manuals. There is also the WAVE blog, WAVE fact sheets and WAVE statistics, all accessible through the main website. WAVE publishes a magazine called Fempower, whose articles appear on the WAVE blog. In April 2020, during the COVID-19 pandemic, WAVE launched a podcast series called "What the WAVE?". The podcast offers an alternative perspective from a feminist viewpoint and features stories of notable feminist figures. The podcast is advertised on WAVE's social media. WAVE disseminates information through social media platforms including Instagram, Facebook and X (formerly Twitter).

== Events ==
WAVE hosts an annual conference whose theme and location change every year:

2024 – From emergency support to violence prevention: 30 years of championing women's rights (30 September – 1 October) Vienna

2023– 25th Wave Conference "Institutional violence and its impact on women's human rights across Europe" (Madrid)

2022 – 24th WAVE Conference: Women's specialist services as pillars of peace in times of crisis and beyond, 10–11 October, held in Prague, together with ROSA Center for Women and proFEM – Center for Victims of Domestic and Sexual Violence.

2021 – The 23rd WAVE Conference 2021 "Preventing and Tackling Sexualised Violence against Women and Children", held online on October 6–7

2020 – Structural inequality: the root of the global pandemic of violence against women (Online conference)

2019 – "25 Years of Defending Women's Human Rights: Milestones and Visions for the Future" (Tallinn, Estonia, 7–9 October)

2018 – The Importance of Women's Specialist Services in Tackling Violence Against Women (Valletta, Malta)

2017 – From Backlash to Effective Response: Step Up Together for the Protection of Women and Girls from all Forms of Violence (Budapest, Hungary)

2016 – Step Up Europe – Unite to End Violence Against Women and Their Children (Berlin, Germany)

2015 – The 17th Wave conference "Women's Collective Strength to Stop Violence! Conference to Strengthen the WAVE Network" (The Hague, The Netherlands)

2014 – The 16th Wave conference "Further Perspectives on Preventing Violence Against Women and Their Children", held in Vienna (Austria), 16–19 November, coinciding with the 20th anniversary of WAVE.

2013 – The 15th Wave conference "To Live Free from Violence – A Human Right for Women and Their Children or a Postcode Lottery"? was held in Sofia, Bulgaria), from 10 to 12 October and was organized with the help of BGRF. There were more than 200 participants from 33 countries.

2012 – The 14th Wave conference "Whose Voices? Whose Needs? Whose Decisions"? was held in London (England), organized it with the help of IMKAAM and Women's Aid Federation. The Conference brought together around 360 participants, from 38 countries.

2011 – The 13th Wave conference "Strengthening the Efforts to prevent Violence against Women and their Children in Europe and in the Mediterranean Region" was held in Rome (Italy), on 11–13 October, in collaboration with DIRe, Donne in Rete contro la violenza. This conference gathered more than 400 participants were present for this event from 38 countries.

2010 – The 12th Wave Conference "Europe United: Ending Violence Against Women – Towards Better Laws, Policies and Support Services", was held in Warsaw, (Poland), on 14–16 October 2010, co-organized by the Centrum Praw Kobiet. This conference gathered more than 300 participants from 24 countries.

2009 – The 11th Wave Conference "Stop Violence Against Women and Children", held in Vienna (Austria), on 24–26 September 2009

2008 – The 10th Wave conference "Role of Women's NGOs in Preventing and Eliminating Violence Against Women" was held in Košice, Slovakia, in collaboration with Fenestra

2007 – The 9th Wave conference "Stop Domestic Violence Against Women" was held in Vilnius, (Lithuania) 18–21 October 2007 in collaboration with Vilnius Women's House/Crisis Centre for Women

2006 – The 8th WAVE Conference was in Lisbon (Portugal) on 26–28 October 2006. It was organized with the help of the FPS AMCV.

2005 – The 7th Wave Conference was held in Copenhagen, Denmark, held with the collaboration of L.O.K.K,

2004 – (Vienna, Austria)

2003 – "Wave violence goodbye! New strategies from a feminist perspective" (Dunajská Streda, Slovakia)

1999 – The 3rd WAVE Conference, Sweden (Gothenburg), with the help of ROKS, 13–15 November 1999. 97 women from 19 countries participated in this conference.

1998 – The 2nd Wave conference was held in Vienna

1997 – The First Wave conference was held in Belgrade (in collaboration with SOS hotline for Women and Children Victims of Violence)

WAVE also conducts training workshops and study visits for member countries.
