= Elizabeth J. Kelly =

American statistician

Elizabeth J. Kelly is an American statistician who works at the Los Alamos National Laboratory on statistical problems in environmental assessment, environmental remediation, and plutonium storage and disposal.

== Education and career ==
Kelly majored in mathematics at the University of Southern California, graduating in 1965. She stayed at the University of Southern California for a master's degree in mathematics, earned in 1967, completed a Ph.D. in biostatistics at the University of California, Los Angeles in 1984, and joined the Los Alamos National Laboratory research staff in 1985.

== Recognition ==
In 2016, Kelly was elected as a Fellow of the American Statistical Association (ASA), associated with the ASA Section on Statistics in Defense and National Security. She is a 2020 winner of the ASA Statistics in Physical Engineering Sciences Award, shared with two other Los Alamos statisticians, Kirk Veirs and Brian Weaver.
