= Journal of Sexual Aggression =

- Discipline: Sexology
- Language: English
- Edited by: Nadine McKillop

Publication details
- History: 1994-present
- Publisher: Routledge
- Frequency: Triannually

Standard abbreviations
- ISO 4: J. Sex. Aggress.

Indexing
- ISSN: 1355-2600 (print); 1742-6545 (web)
- OCLC no.: 56449209

The Journal of Sexual Aggression is a peer-reviewed academic journal It provides an international and interdisciplinary forum for the dissemination of original research findings, reviews, theory, and practice developments regarding sexual aggression in all its forms. The Journal aims to engage readers from a wide range of research, practice and policy areas, including prevention science, crime science, public health, law and regulation, policing and investigation, prosecution and sentencing, corrections and youth justice, child protection, victim advocacy and support, clinical and risk assessment, and offender treatment and risk management. The Journal recognises that human sexual aggression is a global problem, and therefore includes high quality contributions, written in English, from around the world. It is the official journal of the National Organisation for the Treatment of Abuse (NOTA). The Editor-in-Chief of the journal as of 2021 is A/Professor Nadine McKillop.

== Abstracting and indexing ==
The journal is abstracted and indexed in Applied Social Sciences Index and Abstracts, CINAHL, Criminal Justice Abstracts, Family Studies Database, International Bibliography of the Social Sciences, PsycINFO, and PASCAL.
