= Rape Crisis England & Wales =

UK umbrella organisation

Rape Crisis England and Wales
- Purpose: Stopping sexual violence
- Headquarters: Leeds, England
- Location(s): England and Wales
- Services: Rape crisis centre
- Website: www.rapecrisis.org.uk

Rape Crisis England and Wales is the national umbrella organisation for non-profit rape crisis centres across England and Wales. As a registered charity, Rape Crisis also works to raise awareness of sexual violence and campaign for change. The rape crisis centres it represents are distinct from sexual assault referral centres, or SARCs, which are run by the NHS.

== Services ==
Rape Crisis runs a freephone helpline for people who want to talk about what has happened to them. Specialist support is also available at rape crisis centres which are located throughout the UK. Rape Crisis is independent of the government and criminal justice system, and its services are available irrespective of whether or not the person wants to report the assault. In fact, only around 10% of the people who use Rape Crisis services also report the assault to the police. These not-for-profit community-based centres are distinct from sexual assault referral centres, or SARCs, which are funded and run by the National Health Service. SARC staff comprise specifically-trained doctors, nurses, and other support staff.

== Impact of rape crisis services ==
Rape and sexual violence affects a significant proportion of the population. In the UK around 1 in 4 women (24%) are sexually assaulted during their lifetime, and there are about 80,000 incidents of rape or attempted rape every year. A study by Durham University found that Rape Crisis centres are highly effective in supporting women who have been sexually assaulted. Nicole Westmarland and colleagues asked women who had used Rape Crisis centres about the ways in which the support they received had helped them in their lives. The number of people who said that they felt in control of their life doubled following Rape Crisis counselling, and mental health symptoms such as flashbacks and panic attacks were alleviated in around a third of the women who had initially reported these problems.

== Rape Crisis: Responding to Sexual Violence ==
Rape Crisis: Responding to Sexual Violence, by Helen Jones and Kate Cook (2008) charts the history of the rape crisis movement, from its great successes in supporting victim-survivors of sexual violence, to its significant losses as the number of rape crisis centres has dwindled. In the preface, former Chair of Rape Crisis Nicole Westmarland describes the book as an opportunity for people outside the rape crisis movement to understand its work and motivations. She describes Rape Crisis' journey as simultaneously depressing and inspiring. On the one hand the movement by its very nature highlights the ubiquitous nature of rape, and many rape crisis centres face a continuous battle to secure adequate funds; yet on the other hand rape crisis acts as a testament to the bravery of victim-survivors of sexual assault, and the strength of those who work to support them.

== The crisis in rape crisis ==
In 1984 there were 68 rape crisis centres in the UK, in 2010 this number had fallen to 39. Many Rape Crisis Centres are severely underfunded, with only 1 in 5 centres managing to attain the full funding that they require.

== See also ==
- Rape Crisis Movement
- Women's Aid Federation of England
- Rape Crisis Scotland
