= Child Abuse Review =

- Discipline: Social work
- Language: English
- Edited by: Jane V. Appleton; Peter Sidebotham

Publication details
- History: 1992–present
- Publisher: Wiley (United Kingdom)
- Frequency: Bimonthly
- Impact factor: 1.543 (2016)

Standard abbreviations
- ISO 4: Child Abuse Rev.

Indexing
- CODEN: CABEEB
- ISSN: 0952-9136 (print); 1099-0852 (web)
- LCCN: 93643754
- OCLC no.: 225105359

Links
- Journal homepage; Online access; Online archive

Child Abuse Review is a bimonthly peer-reviewed academic journal with a focus on child protection, including research findings, practice developments, training initiatives and policy issues. It is also the journal of the Association of Child Protection Professionals (AoCPP), formerly the British Association for the Study and Prevention of Child Abuse and Neglect (BASPCAN).

It is co-edited by Jane V. Appleton (Oxford Brookes University), and Peter Sidebotham (University of Warwick).

According to the Journal Citation Reports, the journal has a 2016 impact factor of 1.543, ranking it 9th out of 42 journals in the category "Social Work" and 19th out of 43 journals in the category "Family Studies".

== Wiley Best Paper Prize ==
In 2015 a triennial award was introduced for papers published in the journal of "high quality and impact". Winners have included Kirsten Stalker and Katherine McArthur (University of Strathclyde) in 2015 and Emma Katz (Liverpool Hope University) in 2018.
