= Lawrence Gostin =

American law professor (born 1949)

- Born: Lawrence Oglethorpe Gostin; October 19, 1949 (age 77); New York, New York, U.S.
- Occupation: Law professor
- Title: University Professor (since 2012); O’Neill Professor of Global Health Law (2007–2012)
- Awards: Member of the National Academy of Medicine (2000); Fellow of the Royal Society for Public Health (2007)

Academic background
- Education: State University of New York, Brockport (BA, 1971); Duke University (JD, 1974)

Academic work
- Discipline: Health law
- Institutions: Georgetown University (1994–present); Johns Hopkins University (1995–2013); Harvard University (1985–1994)

Lawrence Oglethorpe Gostin (born October 19, 1949) is an American law professor at Georgetown University Law Center who specializes in global health law as well as the law of public health and human rights. Formerly a Fulbright Fellow, Gostin focuses on health law and holds appointments at Georgetown University, including as Distinguished University Professor, the university's highest faculty honor. He is the lead author of the Model State Emergency Health Powers Act and is a contributor to journals on medicine and law.

== Early life and education ==
Lawrence Oglethorpe Gostin was born in New York City on October 19, 1949, the son of Joseph and Sylvia Gostin. He received a B.A. degree in psychology from the State University of New York at Brockport in 1971 and a J.D. from the Duke University School of Law in 1974. From 1974 to 1975, Gostin served as a Fulbright Fellow in psychiatry and law at the University of Oxford and the University of London.

== Career ==
Following his Fulbright fellowship, Gostin remained in the United Kingdom and became the legal director of mental health charity Mind. There, he served as inaugural head of the charity's legal and welfare rights department and worked there until 1983. During his time at Mind, he was instrumental in the organization's campaign regarding reform of mental health legislation. According to Jennifer Brown, Gostin's writings on "new legalism" – a regulatory philosophy which combined protection of mental health patients' civil rights with entitlement to proper mental health treatment – was a large influence on the Mental Health Act 1983. Gostin himself estimated that two thirds of the act were based on proposals from Mind or from his writings. As legal director, Gostin also oversaw the filing of many test cases at the European Commission of Human Rights and European Court of Human Rights "highlighting the absence of possibilities for a legal review of detention [under UK mental health legislation] for many." According to the book Leading Works in Health Law and Ethics (Routledge, 2023) and its reviews, Gostin's work "inspired thinking and research on mental health law" and "helped destigmatise mental illness".

From 1983 to 1985, Gostin was the general secretary of the National Council for Civil Liberties in the United Kingdom. From 1986 to 1994, he was executive director of the American Society of Law, Medicine and Ethics and editor-in-chief of the Journal of Law, Medicine & Ethics; during the period 1987 to 1988, he was also legislative counsel to Senator Edward Kennedy. In 1994, the State University of New York awarded Gostin a Doctor of Laws (Hon.) degree. He was also elected to the National Academy of Medicine in 2000.

Additionally, from 1985 to 1994, Gostin was an adjunct faculty member in law and public health at Harvard University, where he also served under William J. Curran as the associate director of the World Health Organization collaborating center on health legislation from 1988 to 1994. After leaving Harvard, Gostin joined the faculty of Georgetown University in 1994.

In December 2001, Gostin released a draft of the Model State Emergency Health Powers Act, a legislation model backed by the Centers for Disease Control and Prevention intended to "increase state powers to respond to bioterrorism or other outbreaks of disease". Although Gostin, as lead author of the act, published an article supporting it in JAMA, the Model Act attracted criticism from the American Civil Liberties Union, Institute for Health Freedom, and Association of American Physicians and Surgeons, as well as scholars Jane Orient and George Annas, for being overly broad with a potential for abuse.

From 2004 to 2008, Gostin served as the associate dean for research at Georgetown Law. In 2007, he was made a Fellow of the Royal Society for Public Health. From 2010 to 2016, he served as the editor-in-chief of the MDPI journal Laws (ISSN 2075-471X). He was also awarded an honorary Doctor of Laws degree by the University of Sydney in 2012.

Gostin held a secondary appointment as a professor of law and public health at Johns Hopkins University from 1997 to 2013; from 1995 to 2010 he had directed the Center for Law and the Public's Health at Hopkins. In 2007, Gostin became the inaugural Linda D. and Timothy J. O’Neill Professor of Global Health Law. When the O’Neill Institute for National and Global Health Law at Georgetown was founded in 2008, he became its director. In 2012, the president of Georgetown University named Gostin University Professor (also called Distinguished University Professor; the highest professional honor for a Georgetown faculty member) in honor of his "outstanding record of scholarly accomplishment".

Since its launch in 2015, Gostin has served with John Monahan as co-chairs of the Lancet–O'Neill Institute Commission on Global Health and the Law, which aims to study the role of law in addressing global health issues. The O’Neill Institute was named a World Health Organization collaborating center on public health law and human rights in 2017. Since 2017, Gostin has also been the global health and legal editor of JAMA.

At the O’Neill Institute, Gostin has been a proponent of the Framework Convention on Global Health, a proposed treaty enshrining the right to health into law. It has been endorsed by Ban Ki-moon and Michel Sidibé.

Gostin's notable students include Alexandra Phelan, who received her Doctor of Juridical Science degree under Gostin in 2020.

== Speaking and views ==
Gostin has given multiple keynote addresses at conferences, and has been awarded distinguished lectures at institutions in the United States and abroad. He has also spoken at numerous Federalist Society–sponsored events, webinars and conferences of the Consortium on Law and Values at the University of Minnesota, and to the Center for Strategic and International Studies. Gostin gave the spring LIFE B. Braun Lecture at the University of Lucerne in Switzerland in 2026.

Gostin presented on the national health information infrastructure at an Assistant Secretary for Planning and Evaluation conference in 2003. He was a speaker in a workshop at the 2025 World Health Summit. In December 2025, Gostin participated in a "fireside chat" with Dean Cathy Bradley at the Colorado School of Public Health.

In a January 2020 interview with NPR, Gostin argued against travel restrictions to prevent the spread of COVID-19, stating, "the risk is extraordinarily low for people in the United States." In an April 2021 interview with Vox, he described his previous belief about travel restrictions being bad as an "almost religious belief" with no evidence behind it, saying "I have now realized ... that our belief about travel restrictions was just that — a belief. It was evidence-free".

Regarding the overturning of Roe v. Wade, Gostin said the Dobbs decision was "much more extreme than the justices are making it out to be". Speaking on Democracy Now! in January 2025, Gostin called President Donald Trump's withdrawal of the US from the World Health Organization "an attack on science, public health and public health institutions".

== Honors and awards ==
As of 2026, the magazine Washingtonian lists Gostin among the top 500 most influential people shaping policy in America. Gostin is a member of the Council on Foreign Relations and a fellow of the Hastings Center and Kennedy Institute of Ethics. He is profiled in the St. Martin's Press and A. & C. Black Who's Who series, as well as in Marquis Who's Who.

- 2018 – Albert Nelson Marquis Lifetime Achievement Award, Marquis Who's Who
- 2015 – Lifetime Achievement in Public Health Law, American Public Health Association
- 2012 – Honorary Doctor of Laws, University of Sydney
- 2007 – Elected Fellow of the Royal Society for Public Health
- 2006 – Honorary Fellow, Cardiff University, for "international distinction and scholarship in law and public health"
- 2006 – Adam Yarmolinsky Medal, National Academy of Medicine, for "a member ... outside the health and medical sciences ... [who has] contributed in multiple ways to the mission of the NAM"
- 2000 – Elected Member of the National Academy of Medicine
- 1994 – Honorary Doctor of Laws, State University of New York, the "highest form of recognition offered by the Board of Trustees ... to persons of exceptional distinction outside the University"
- 1987 – Key to Tohoku University, for "distinguished contributions to human rights in mental health"
- 1983 – Rosemary Delbridge Memorial Award, National Consumer Council, for "the person who has most influenced parliament for the welfare of society"

Source: Georgetown Law

== Selected publications ==
=== Books ===
- Foundations of Global Health & Human Rights (co-editor; Oxford University Press, 2020)
- Human Rights in Global Health: Rights-Based Governance for a Globalizing World (co-editor; Oxford University Press, 2018)
- Principles of Mental Health Law and Policy (co-author; Oxford University Press, 2010)
- Public Health Law: Power, Duty, Restraint (University of California Press and Milbank Memorial Fund, 2nd ed. 2008)
- Public Health Ethics: Theory, Policy and Practice (Oxford University Press, 2007)
- The AIDS Pandemic: Complacency, Injustice, and Unfulfilled Expectations (University of North Carolina Press, 2004)
- The Human Rights of Persons with Intellectual Disabilities: Different But Equal (Oxford University Press, 2003)
- Public Health Law and Ethics: A Reader (University of California Press and Milbank Memorial Fund, 2002)

=== Articles and chapters ===
- Gostin, Lawrence O.; Wiley, Lindsay F. (June 2, 2020). "Governmental Public Health Powers During the COVID-19 Pandemic: Stay-at-home Orders, Business Closures, and Travel Restrictions". JAMA. 323 (21): 2137. doi:10.1001/jama.2020.5460.
- Phelan, Alexandra L.; Katz, Rebecca; Gostin, Lawrence O. (February 25, 2020). "The Novel Coronavirus Originating in Wuhan, China". JAMA. 323 (8): 709. doi:10.1001/jama.2020.1097.
- Gostin, Lawrence O.; Sridhar, Devi (May 1, 2014). "Global Health and the Law". New England Journal of Medicine. 370 (18): 1732–1740. doi:10.1056/NEJMra1314094.
- Gostin, Lawrence O.; Sapsin, Jason W.; Teret, Stephen P.; Burris, Scott; Mair, Julie Samia; Hodge, Jr, James G.; Vernick, Jon S. (August 7, 2002). "The Model State Emergency Health Powers Act: Planning for and Response to Bioterrorism and Naturally Occurring Infectious Diseases". JAMA. 288 (5): 622. doi:10.1001/jama.288.5.622.
- Gostin, Lawrence O.; et al. (June 26, 1996). "The Public Health Information Infrastructure: A National Review of the Law on Health Information Privacy". JAMA. 275 (24): 1921. doi:10.1001/jama.1996.03530480063042.
- Gostin, Lawrence; Turek-Brezina, Joan; Powers, Madison; Kozloff, Rene (January 1, 1995). "Privacy and Security of Health Information in the Emerging Health Care System". Health Matrix. 5 (1). Case Western Reserve University School of Law: 1. ISSN 0748-383X.
- Mann, Jonathan M.; Gostin, Lawrence; Gruskin, Sofia; Brennan, Troyen; Lazzarini, Zita; Fineberg, Harvey V. (Fall 1994). "Health and Human Rights". Health and Human Rights. 1 (1): 6. doi:10.2307/4065260.
- Gostin, L. (1986). "The Ideology of Entitlement: The Contemporary Function of Law and Its Application to Psychiatry". In Carmi, Amnon; Schneider, Stanley; Hefez, Albert (eds.). Psychiatry — Law and Ethics. Springer. pp. 74–80. doi:10.1007/978-3-642-82574-3_6. ISBN 978-3-642-82574-3.
