= Tomasz Sroka =

Polish jurist (born 1982)

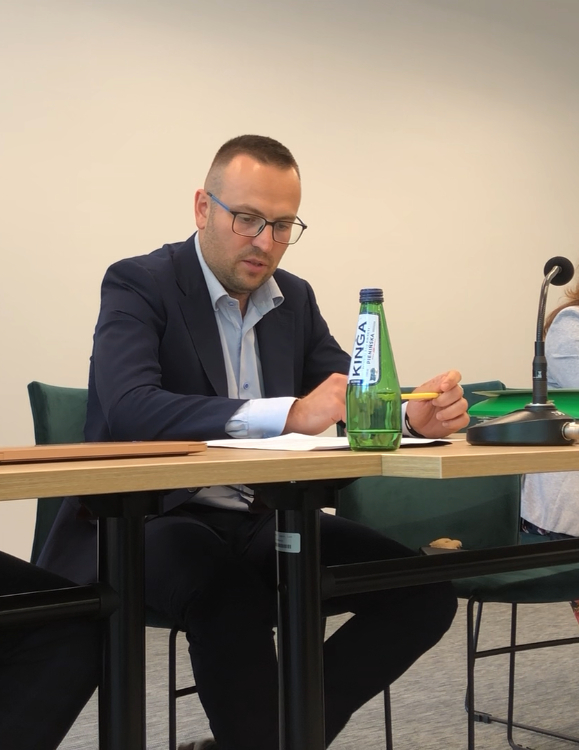
- Tomasz Sroka in 2022
- Born: 1982 (age 43–44)
- Citizenship: Polish
- Education: Jagiellonian University
- Occupation: Jurist
- Website: tomaszsroka.eu

Tomasz Sroka (born 1982) is a jurist.

== Biography ==
In 2006 he graduated in law from the Jagiellonian University. In 2012 he obtained doctorate under the supervision of Włodzimierz Wróbel. In 2022 he obtained habilitation. His research interests include medical law, health law, criminal law, international medical law, and public health law. He has become a lecturer at the Jagiellonian University and member of the Disciplinary Committee for Students of the Jagiellonian University.
