= WAML =

WAML may refer to:

- WAML (AM), a radio station (1340 AM) licensed to Laurel, Mississippi, United States
- The ICAO code for Mutiara Airport in Palu, Central Sulawesi, Indonesia
- West Anglia Main Line, a railway line in the United Kingdom
- World Association for Medical Law, an international not-for-profit organization focusing on health law, legal medicine and bioethics
- Western Association of Map Libraries, a North American library association.
