= Michael Grodin =

American academic and physician (1951–2023)

- Born: Michael Alan Grodin; December 26, 1951; Santa Monica, California
- Died: March 1, 2023 (aged 71)
- Awards: Norman A. Scotch Award for Excellence in Teaching

Academic background
- Education: Massachusetts Institute of Technology, Albert Einstein College of Medicine

Academic work
- Main interests: Health law, bioethics, and human rights

Michael Alan Grodin (December 26, 1951 – March 1, 2023) was an American academic and physician who was the professor of Health Law, Bioethics, and Human Rights at the Boston University School of Public Health, where he has received the distinguished Faculty Career Award for Research and Scholarship, and 20 teaching awards, including the "Norman A. Scotch Award for Excellence in Teaching." He was also a Professor of Family Medicine and Psychiatry at the Boston University School of Medicine. In addition, Dr. Grodin was the Director of the Project on Medicine and the Holocaust at the Elie Wiesel Center for Judaic Studies, and a member of the faculty of the Division of Religious and Theological Studies. He had been on the faculty at Boston University for 35 years. He completed his B.S. degree at the Massachusetts Institute of Technology, his M.D. degree from the Albert Einstein College of Medicine, and his postdoctoral and fellowship training at the University of California, Los Angeles and Harvard University.

== Biography ==
Michael Grodin was the Medical Ethicist at Boston Medical Center, and for thirteen years served as the Human Studies Chairman for the Department of Health and Hospitals of the City of Boston. He was a fellow of the Hastings Center; served on the board of directors of Public Responsibility in Medicine and Research, and the American Society of Law, Medicine and Ethics; and served on the Advisory Board of the Center for the Philosophy and History of Science. He was a member of the National Committee on Bioethics of the American Academy of Pediatrics and the Committee on Ethics of the American College of Obstetricians and Gynecologists. Professor Grodin served on the Ethics Committee of the Massachusetts Center for Organ Transplantation, was a consultant to the National Human Subjects Protection Review Panel of the National Institutes of Health AIDS Program Advisory Committee, and is a consultant on Ethics and Research with Human Subjects for the International Organizations of Medical Sciences and the World Health Organization. He was a member of the Ethics Review Board of Physicians for Human Rights.

Grodin was the Co-Founder of Global Lawyers and Physicians: Working Together for Human Rights; Co-Director of the Boston Center for Refugee Health and Human Rights: Caring for Survivors of Torture; and received a special citation from the United States Holocaust Memorial Museum in recognition of his "profound contributions - through original and creative research - to the cause of Holocaust education and remembrance." He was an internationally recognized authority on Medicine during the Holocaust. The Refugee Center which he Co-Directs received the 2002 Outstanding Achievement Award from the Political Asylum/Immigration Representation Project for "sensitivity and dedication in caring for the health and human rights of refugees and survivors of torture." He is a Member of the Global Implementation Project of the Istanbul Protocol Manual on the Effective Investigation and Documentation of Torture and Other Cruel, Inhuman or Degrading Treatment or Punishment, and an Advisor to UNESCO. Grodin was the 2000 Julius Silberger Scholar and 2014 Kravetz award recipient as an elected member of the Boston Psychoanalytic Society and Institute and the American Psychoanalytic Association. Four times named one of America's Top Physicians, he received four national Humanism in Medicine and Humanitarian Awards for "integrity, clinical excellence and compassion," "outstanding humanism in medicine and integrity as a faculty member," and "compassion, empathy, respect and cultural sensitivity in the delivery of care to patients and their families."

Grodin's primary areas of interest included the relationship of health and human rights, medicine and the holocaust, and bioethics.

Grodin died March 1, 2023, at the age of 71.

== Selected bibliography ==
Grodin delivered over 600 invited regional, national, and international addresses, written more than 200 scholarly papers, and edited or co-edited seven books.

=== Books ===
- Grodin, Michael A.; Annas, George J. (1992). The Nazi doctors and the Nuremberg Code: human rights in human experimentation. New York, New York: Oxford University Press. ISBN 9780195101065.

Book review: Yarmolinsky, Adam (May 13, 1993). "Book Review The Nazi Doctors and the Nuremberg Code: Human Rights in Human Experimentation Edited by George J. Annas and Michael A. Grodin. 371 pp. New York, Oxford University Press, 1992. $29.95. 0-19-507042-9". New England Journal of Medicine. 328 (19): 1429–1430. doi:10.1056/NEJM199305133281922. ISSN 0028-4793.

- Grodin, Michael A.; Glantz, Leonard H. (1994). Children as research subjects: science, ethics, and law. Bioethics series. New York, New York: Oxford University Press. ISBN 9780195071030.

Book review: Ernhart, Claire B. (August 11, 1994). "Book Review Children as Research Subjects: Science, Ethics, and Law Edited by Michael A. Grodin and Leonard H. Glantz. 258 pp. New York, Oxford University Press, 1994. 0-19-507103-4". New England Journal of Medicine. 331 (6): 409. doi:10.1056/NEJM199408113310621. ISSN 0028-4793.

- Grodin, Michael A. (1995). Meta medical ethics: the philosophical foundations of bioethics. Boston Studies in the Philosophy of Science. Dordrecht Boston: Kluwer Academic Publishers. ISBN 9781402002526.

Book review: Peterson, Lynn M. (September 28, 1995). "Book Review Meta Medical Ethics: The philosophical foundations of bioethics (Boston Studies in the Philosophy of Science. Vol. 171.) Edited by Michael A. Grodin. 205 pp. Boston, Kluwer Academic, 1995. 0-7923-3344-6". New England Journal of Medicine. 333 (13): 885–886. doi:10.1056/NEJM199509283331322. ISSN 0028-4793.

- Grodin, Michael A.; Mann, Jonathan M.; Gruskin, Sofia; Annas, George J. (1999). Health and human rights: a reader. New York: Routledge. ISBN 9780415921022.

Book review: Burke, Nora (August 2001). "Health and Human Rights (review)". Human Rights Quarterly. 23 (3): 846–851. doi:10.1353/hrq.2001.0029. S2CID 143663668. Selected as second of the top ten humanitarian books of 1999.

- Grodin, Michael A.; Gruskin, Sofia (2005). Perspectives on health and human rights. New York, New York: Routledge. ISBN 9780415948074.
- Grodin, Michael A. (2013). Health and human rights in a changing world (3rd ed.). New York, New York: Routledge. ISBN 9780415503990.
- Grodin, Michael A. (2014). Jewish medical resistance in the Holocaust. New York, New York: Berghahn Books. ISBN 9781782384182.
- Grodin, Michael A. (forthcoming). Medical Halacha and Rabbinic Responsa in the Ghettos and Camps During the Holocaust.

=== Journal articles ===
- Grodin, Michael A. (1978). "Ethical issues in perinatology – the rights of the fetus and newborn". Journal of Clinical Child Psychology. 7 (3): 184–187. doi:10.1080/15374417809532857. PMID 11663055.
- Grodin, Michael A. (Autumn 1990). "Patient choice and fetal therapy". Women's Health Issues. 1 (1): 18–20. doi:10.1016/S1049-3867(05)80008-8. PMID 2136294.
- Grodin, Michael A. (March 1991). "Informed consent and medical benefit selection". Journal of Occupational and Environmental Medicine. 33 (3): 298–299. PMID 2030427.
- Grodin, Michael A.; Brett, Allan (April 10, 1991). "Ethical aspects of human experimentation in health services research". JAMA: The Journal of the American Medical Association. 265 (14): 1854–1857. doi:10.1001/jama.1991.03460140082031. PMID 1900895.
- Grodin, Michael A. (Summer 1991). "Surrogate motherhood and the best interests of the child". Women's Health Issues. 1 (3): 135–137. doi:10.1016/S1049-3867(05)80116-1. PMID 1822381.
- Grodin, Michael A. (Spring 1993). "The evolution of informed consent: beyond an ethics of care". Women's Health Issues. 3 (1): 11–13. doi:10.1016/S1049-3867(05)80226-9. PMID 8485405.
- Grodin, Michael A. (September 1996). "Women's health and end-of-life decision making". Women's Health Issues. 6 (5): 295–300. doi:10.1016/1049-3867(95)00076-3. PMID 8870509.
- Grodin, Michael A.; Annas, George J. (November 27, 1996). "Legacies of Nuremberg: medical ethics and human rights". JAMA: The Journal of the American Medical Association. 276 (20): 1682–1683. doi:10.1001/jama.1996.03540200068035. PMID 8922458.
- Grodin, Michael A.; Roche, Patricia A. (May 2000). "The ethical challenge of stem cell research". Women's Health Issues. 10 (3): 136–139. doi:10.1016/S1049-3867(00)00037-2. PMID 10828550.
- Grodin, Michael A.; Moreno, Alejandro (August 2, 2000). "The not-so-silent marks of torture (photo/essay)". JAMA: The Journal of the American Medical Association. 284 (5): 538. doi:10.1001/jama.284.5.538. PMID 10918683.
- Grodin, Michael A.; Laurie, Graeme T. (November 1, 2000). "Susceptibility genes and neurological disorders: learning the right lessons From the human genome project". Archives of Neurology. 57 (11): 1569–1574. doi:10.1001/archneur.57.11.1569. PMID 11074788.
- Grodin, Michael A.; Samuels, Benjamin J. (Rabbi) (September 25, 2013). "Controversy over contraception coverage". JAMA: The Journal of the American Medical Association. 310 (12): 1289. doi:10.1001/jama.2013.276746. PMID 24065022.
