= Four-step impact assessment =

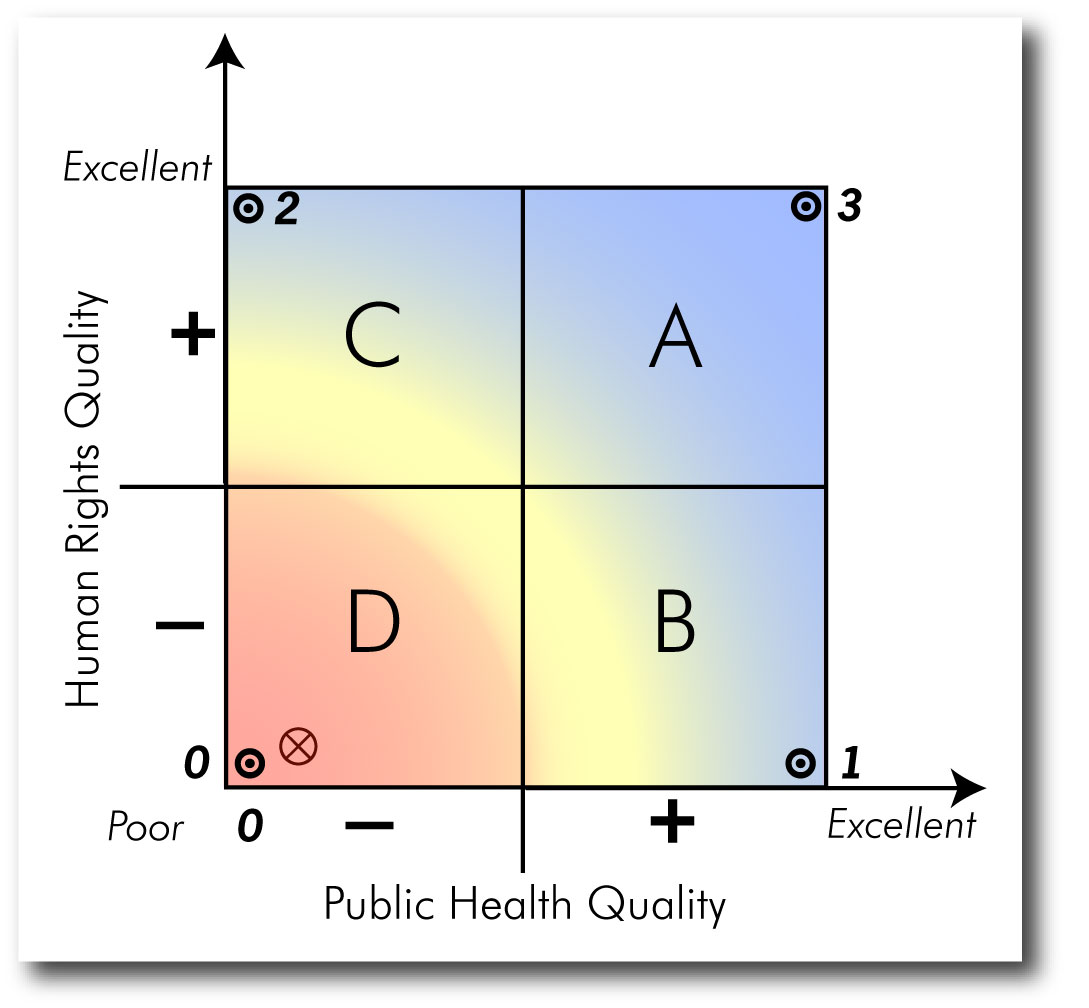
Four-step impact assessment 2x2 grid of health and human rights

The Four-Step Impact Assessment is an academic framework initiated and published by Jonathan Mann and colleagues at the François-Xavier Bagnoud Center for Health and Human Rights at the Harvard School of Public Health. The assessment takes into account the negotiation of objectives between human rights and public health. Such an approach takes into account a measure of each discipline's respective overlap to expose infringement of goals. Such infringement or confluence can be mapped out in what Mann and colleagues proposed in a 2 by 2 table, as illustrated below.

== Assessment ==
The Four-Step Impact Assessment:

1. To what extent does the proposed policy or program represent “good public health”?
2. Is the proposed policy or program respectful and protective of human rights?
3. How can we achieve the best possible combination of public health and human rights quality?
  1. How serious is the public health problem?
  2. Is the proposed response likely to be effective?
  3. What are the severity, scope and duration of the burdens on human rights resulting from the proposed policy or program?
  4. To what extent is the proposed policy or program restrictive and intrusive?
  5. Is the proposed policy or program over inclusive or under inclusive?
  6. What procedural safeguards are included in the proposed policy or program?
  7. Will the proposed policy or program be periodically reviewed to assess both its public health effectiveness and its impact on human rights? Identify specific changes to the proposed policy or program that increase its human rights and/or public health quality while maintaining (or even strengthening) its public health effectiveness.
4. Finally, does the proposed policy or program (as revised) still appear to be the optimal approach to the public health problem?

As a way to visualize the intersection of both health and human rights, this table places Human Rights Quality on the Y-axis, and Public Health Quality on the X-axis. The levels or rank of both measures are graphically displayed at some point in the cartesian plane. The organizations that jointly supported this framework consisted of Mann's Francois Xavier Bagnoud Center for Health and Human Rights, the International Federation of Red Cross, and Red Crescent Societies.

== Background and development ==
Mann was a central advocate of combining the synergistic forces of public health, ethics and human rights. He theorized and actively promoted the idea that human health and human rights are integrally and inextricably connected, arguing that these fields overlap in their respective philosophies and objectives to improve health, well-being, and to prevent premature death.

In his work, Mann proposed a three-pronged approach that has appropriately acted as a fundamental explanation of the relationship between health and human rights. First, health is a human rights issue. Secondly (and conversely), human rights are a health issue. Human rights violations result in adverse health effects. Thirdly, linkages exist between health and human rights (a hypothesis to be rigorously tested). Literature substantiates the effects of the first two points, but Mann and colleagues proceeded to call for the validation of the third point and challenged the world to practice it. With this framework, Mann attempted to bridge a perceived gap of philosophies, correspondence and vocabulary, education and training, recruitment, and work methods between the disciplines of bioethics, jurisprudence, public health law and epidemiology. Furthermore, Mann knew that the history of “conflictual relationships” between officials of public health and civil liberties workers presented challenges to the pursuit of what he called a “powerful” confluence of health and human rights – a positive approach.4 While conflict between disciplines exists, Mann thought it important to first raise awareness of these challenges. In the spirit of negotiation and acting as mediator, Mann pointed out that such an intersection of fields can only benefit if a common ground in philosophies is uncovered and planted with a flag of cooperation.
