= William J. Curran =

American health lawyer (1925–1996)

William John Curran (1925 – September 21, 1996) was an American lawyer and professor known as the father of health law and legal medicine. He was the Lee Professor of Legal Medicine at Harvard University from 1968 until his retirement in 1991. His textbook, Law and Medicine, published in four editions between 1960 and 1990, is considered a foundational text in health law.

== Life and career ==
Curran was born in 1925 and was a native of Boston. Following U.S. Army service during World War II, he attended Boston College on the G.I. Bill. He received a law degree in 1950, followed by a master's degree in law from Harvard in 1951. He held various positions as a law professor, first at Santa Clara University and the University of North Carolina at Chapel Hill, before returning to Boston in 1953 and holding a tenure-track appointment at Boston College. He began giving lectures at Harvard Law School in 1955. In 1957, he moved to Boston University, where he established the Law-Medicine Research Institute. At this time, he also enrolled in a public health degree program at Harvard and soon became the first lawyer known to have graduated with a degree from the Harvard School of Public Health.

In 1968, Harvard University appointed Curran to the Harvard Medical School and School of Public Health. That year, he was named the first Frances Glessner Lee Professor of Legal Medicine, a professorship endowed by Frances Glessner Lee. Also in 1968, Curran began writing a monthly column, "Public Health and the Law", in the American Journal of Public Health. He served as editor of the column until being replaced by George J. Annas in 1983.

During his career, Curran did not hold a formal professorship at Harvard Law School because contemporary law schools did not see it as "warranting that much credibility"; instead he held the Lee Professorship at the medical and public health schools and taught at the law school as a lecturer.

In 1987, Curran began serving as the first director of the World Health Organization (WHO) collaborating center on health legislation at Harvard, with Lawrence Gostin as associate director. The American Journal of Law & Medicine dedicated a special issue to Curran in 1987. The WHO collaborating center operated until 2004.

== Legacy ==
Upon Curran's retirement, it was described by Joseph M. Healy in Connecticut Medicine that the appointments of Curran to the Harvard Medical School and Jay Katz, a physician, to the Yale Law School were likely the most important events that lead to an increase in interdisciplinary scholarship on health law.

Curran has been described variously as the father of legal medicine and of modern health law. The New York Times wrote in an obituary to Curran: "In Massachusetts, whose laws became models for national and international legislation, he left his fingerprints on so many statutes ... that the state's health and medical laws could be called the Curran Code."

== Books ==
During his lifetime, Curran wrote or edited over a dozen books and approximately 100 journal articles. Notable examples are listed here.

=== Law and Medicine ===
The first edition of Law and Medicine: Text and Source Materials on Medico-Legal Problems was published by Little, Brown and Company in 1960. Curran's publication of this book in 1960 is considered the beginning of health law as a field of law. Over 80% of the book covers forensic medicine. Other topics covered include the "medical environment" of medical schools, boards, and hospitals; the scientific method as it compares to the legal concept of modus operandi; differing perspectives on causation between physicians and lawyers; the Monday v. Millsaps, Crowther v. Fenstermaker, and Louisville and Nashville Railroad v. Tucker court cases; and psychiatric evaluation of witnesses. The book was catered toward lawyers and not health professionals; a review of the book praised it as "a good starting point for anyone desiring to add a medicolegal gloss to his traditional legal education", though another mentioned how sections used overly technical medical language that may not be understood by the legal community. In law and medical school courses, this book is used for the topic of "the role of torts in medical malpractice cases, negligence cases, and in business."

Law, Medicine, and Forensic Science was the retitled second edition of Law and Medicine. It was published by Little, Brown and Company in 1970, ten years after the original edition. Content on bioethics was added for this edition, and made up around 10% of its focus. Little, Brown and Company published the third edition of Law, Medicine, and Forensic Science in 1982. Law and Medicine's fourth edition, entitled Health Care Law, Forensic Science, and Public Policy, was co-authored by Curran, Mark A. Hall, and David H. Kaye, and published by Little, Brown in 1990. The 1998 fifth edition, titled Health Care Law and Ethics, was the last to feature Curran as a coauthor; the 6th edition of Health Care Law and Ethics, published in 2003 was authored only by Mark A. Hall, Mary Anne Bobinski, and David Orentlicher.

=== The Law and Mental Health ===
The Law and Mental Health: Harmonizing Objectives, a comparative legislation study by Curran and T. W. Harding that originally appeared in the International Digest of Health Legislation in 1977, was published as a report by the World Health Organization in 1978.

=== Modern Legal Medicine, Psychiatry, and Forensic Science ===
Curran authored the book Modern Legal Medicine, Psychiatry, and Forensic Science with A. Louis McGarry and Charles S. Petty in 1980. It was published by the F.A. Davis Company in 1980.

A later book, Modern Legal Psychiatry and Psychology, written by Curran with McGarry and Saleem Shah, was published by F.A. Davis in 1986.

=== Law-Medicine Notes ===
The book Law-Medicine Notes: Progress in Medicolegal Relations was published in 1989 by NEJM Books, the bookselling division of The New England Journal of Medicine; it was the first book ever published by the journal. The collection included a preface by Arnold S. Relman.
