= Hepatotoxicity =

Liver damage caused by a drug or chemical

- Other names: see below list
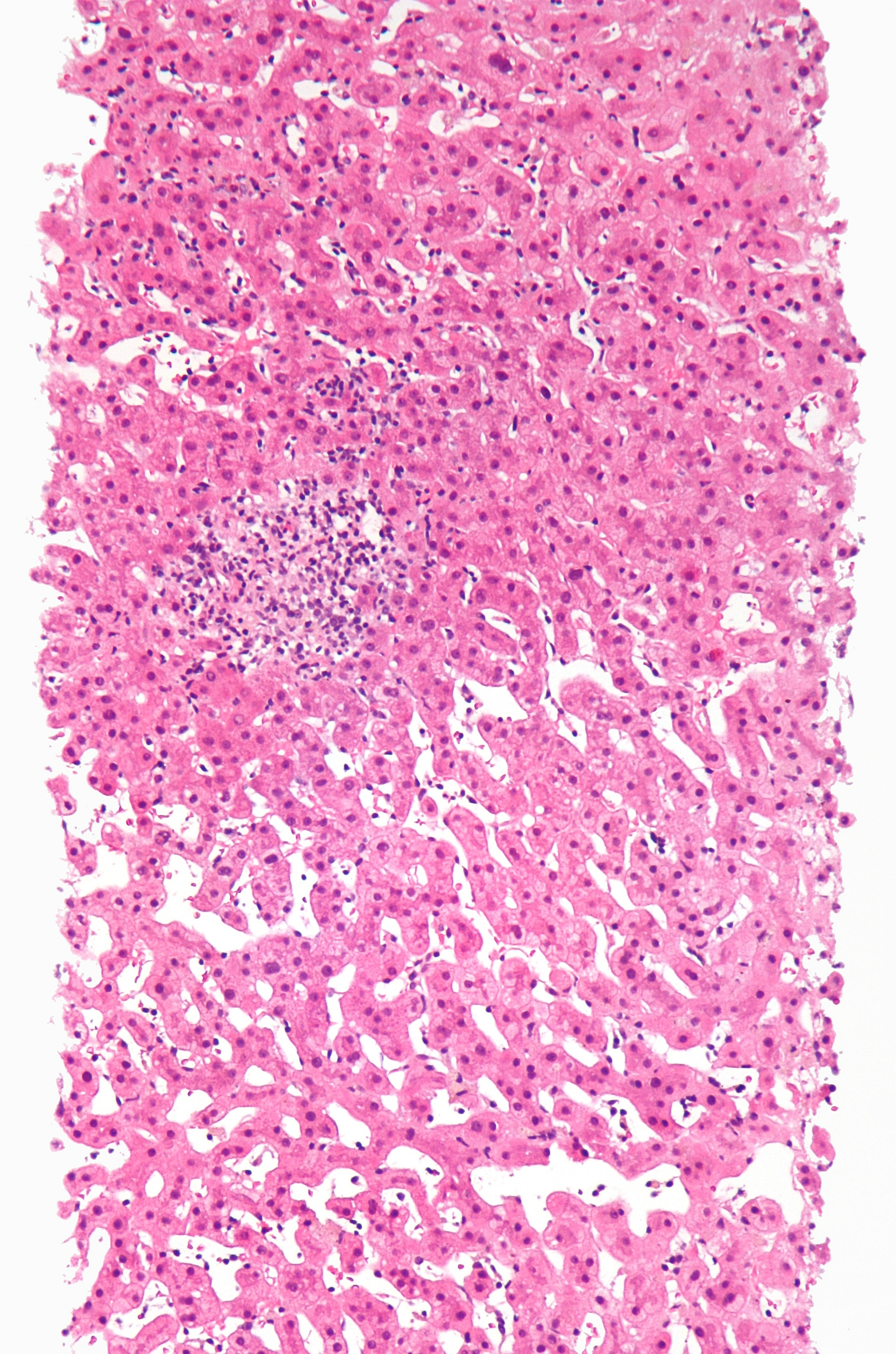
- Drug-induced hepatitis with granulomata. Other causes were excluded with extensive investigations. Liver biopsy. H&E stain.
- Specialty: Gastroenterology, Toxicology
- Symptoms: Drug-induced liver injury (DILI); Toxin-induced hepatitis; Drug-induced hepatitis; Drug-induced hepatic necrosis; Drug-induced hepatic fibrosis; Drug-induced hepatic granuloma; Toxic liver disease with hepatitis; Toxic liver disease with cholestasis; Toxic hepatitis; Toxic liver disease; Toxin-induced liver disease; Drug-induced liver disease; Drug-induced liver damage; Hepatogenous poisoning
- Complications: Cirrhosis, liver failure

Hepatotoxicity refers to chemical-driven liver damage. Drug-induced liver injury (DILI) is a cause of acute and chronic liver disease caused specifically by medications and the most common reason for a drug to be withdrawn from the market after approval.

The liver plays a central role in transforming and clearing chemicals and is susceptible to the toxicity from these agents. Certain medicinal agents when taken in overdoses (e.g. paracetamol, sometimes called acetaminophen), and sometimes even when introduced within therapeutic ranges (e.g. halothane), may injure the organ. Other chemical agents, such as those used in laboratories and industries, natural chemicals (e.g., alpha-amanitin), and herbal remedies (two prominent examples being kava, though the causal mechanism is unknown, and comfrey, through pyrrolizidine alkaloid content) can also induce hepatotoxicity. Chemicals that cause liver injury are called hepatotoxins.

More than 900 drugs have been implicated in causing liver injury (see LiverTox, external link, below) and it is the most common reason for a drug to be withdrawn from the market. Hepatotoxicity and drug-induced liver injury also account for a substantial number of compound failures, highlighting the need for toxicity prediction models (e.g. DTI), and drug screening assays, such as stem cell-derived hepatocyte-like cells, that are capable of detecting toxicity early in the drug development process. Chemicals often cause subclinical injury to the liver, which manifests only as abnormal liver enzyme tests.

Drug-induced liver injury is responsible for 5% of all hospital admissions for jaundice and 50% of all acute liver failures.

== Causes ==
Adverse drug reactions are classified as type A (intrinsic or pharmacological) or type B (idiosyncratic). Type A drug reaction accounts for 80% of all toxicities.

Drugs or toxins that have a pharmacological (type A) hepatotoxicity are those that have predictable dose-response curves (higher concentrations cause more liver damage) and well characterized mechanisms of toxicity, such as directly damaging liver tissue or blocking a metabolic process. As in the case of paracetamol overdose, this type of injury occurs shortly after some threshold for toxicity is reached. Carbon tetrachloride is commonly used to induce acute type A liver injury in animal models.

Idiosyncratic (type B) injury occurs without warning, when agents cause non-predictable hepatotoxicity in susceptible individuals, which is not related to dose and has a variable latency period. This type of injury does not have a clear dose-response nor temporal relationship, and most often does not have predictive models. Idiosyncratic hepatotoxicity has led to the withdrawal of several drugs from market even after rigorous clinical testing as part of the FDA approval process; Troglitazone (Rezulin) and trovafloxacin (Trovan) are two prime examples of idiosyncratic hepatotoxins pulled from market.

The herb kava has caused a number of cases of idiosyncratic liver injury, ranging everywhere from asymptomatic to fatal.

Oral use of the antifungal ketoconazole has been associated with hepatic toxicity, including some fatalities; however, such effects appear to be limited to doses taken over a period longer than 7 days.

=== Paracetamol ===
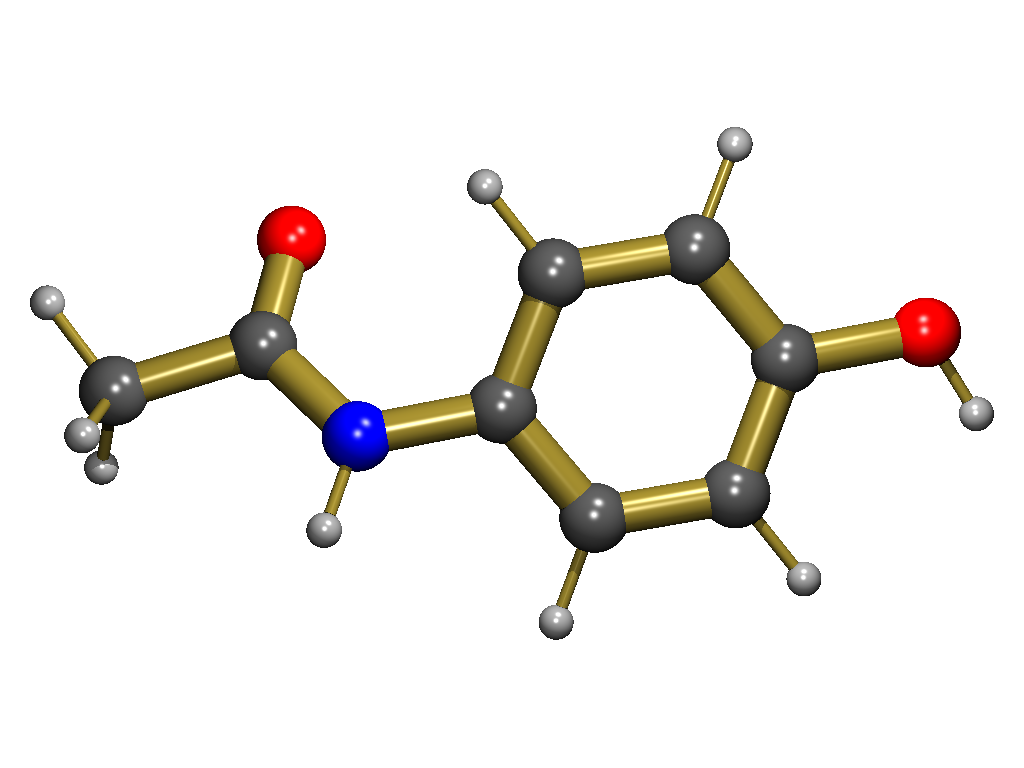
Paracetomol (3D structure) overdose is the most common cause of drug-induced liver disease

Paracetamol also known as acetaminophen, and by the brand names of Tylenol and Panadol, is usually well-tolerated in prescribed dose, but overdose is the most common cause of drug-induced liver disease and acute liver failure worldwide. Damage to the liver is not due to the drug itself but to a toxic metabolite (N-acetyl-p-benzoquinone imine (NAPQI)) produced by cytochrome P-450 enzymes in the liver. In normal circumstances, this metabolite is detoxified by conjugating with glutathione in phase 2 reaction. In an overdose, a large amount of NAPQI is generated, which overwhelms the detoxification process and leads to liver cell damage. Nitric oxide also plays a role in inducing toxicity. The risk of liver injury is influenced by several factors including the dose ingested, concurrent alcohol or other drug intake, interval between ingestion and antidote, etc. The dose toxic to the liver is quite variable from person to person and is often thought to be lower in chronic alcoholics. Measurement of blood level is important in assessing prognosis, higher levels predicting a worse prognosis. Administration of Acetylcysteine, a precursor of glutathione, can limit the severity of the liver damage by capturing the toxic NAPQI. Those that develop acute liver failure can still recover spontaneously, but may require transplantation if poor prognostic signs such as encephalopathy or coagulopathy is present (see King's College Criteria).

=== Nonsteroidal anti-inflammatory drugs ===
Although individual analgesics rarely induce liver damage due to their widespread use, NSAIDs have emerged as a major group of drugs exhibiting hepatotoxicity. Both dose-dependent and idiosyncratic reactions have been documented. Aspirin and phenylbutazone are associated with intrinsic hepatotoxicity; idiosyncratic reaction has been associated with ibuprofen, sulindac, phenylbutazone, piroxicam, diclofenac and indomethacin.

=== Glucocorticoids ===
Glucocorticoids are so named due to their effect on the carbohydrate mechanism. They promote glycogen storage in the liver. An enlarged liver is a rare side-effect of long-term steroid use in children. The classical effect of prolonged use both in adult and paediatric population is steatosis.

=== Isoniazid ===
Isoniazide (INH) is one of the most commonly used drugs for tuberculosis; it is associated with mild elevation of liver enzymes in up to 20% of patients and severe hepatotoxicity in 1-2% of patients.

=== Other hydrazine derivative drugs ===
There are also cases where other hydrazine derivative drugs, such as the MAOI antidepressant iproniazid, are associated with liver damage. Phenelzine has been associated with abnormal liver tests. Toxic effects can develop from antibiotics, such as amoxicillin/clavulanic acid.

=== Anti-thyroid drugs ===
Treatment with methimazole or propylthiouracil for hyperthyroidism, is commonly associated with an elevation of liver enzymes. To differentiate between hyperthyroidism and drug-related liver injury, it is recommended to check baseline liver enzymes prior to initiation of treatment. If liver injury related to anti-thyroid treatment is significant, switching to the alternative agent can be attempted in most cases. Cases of fulminant liver failure reported with propylthiouracil have led to a regulatory warning, and to guidelines recommending methimazole as the first line anti-thyroid agent.

=== Natural products ===
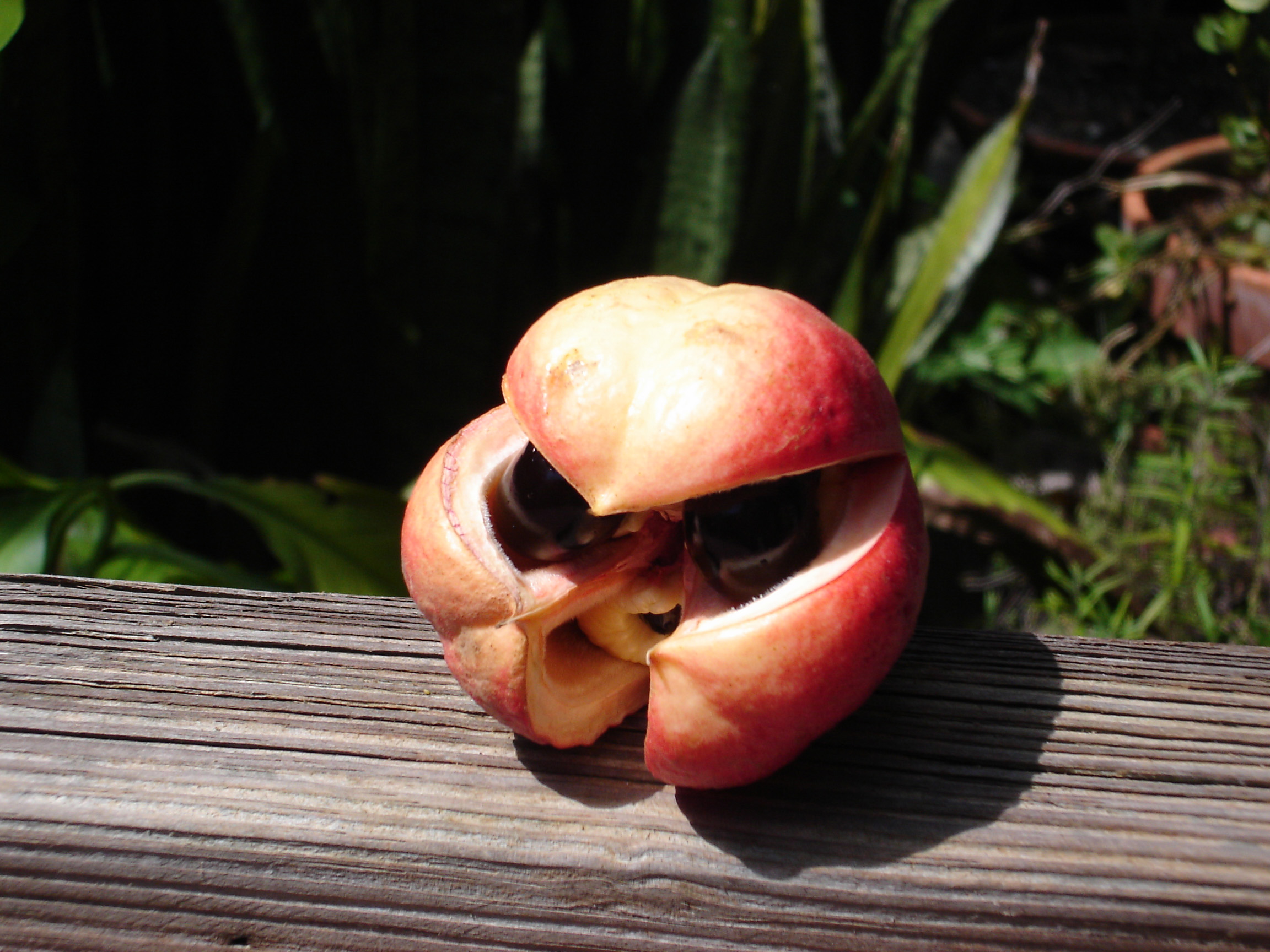
Ackee fruit

Examples include alpha-Amanitin containing mushrooms, kava, and aflatoxin producing molds. Pyrrolizidine alkaloids, which occur in some plants, can be toxic. Green tea extract is a growing cause of liver failure due to its inclusion in more products.

=== Alternative remedies ===
Examples include: Ackee fruit, Bajiaolian, Camphor, Copaltra, Cycasin, Garcinia, Kava leaves, pyrrolizidine alkaloids, Horse chestnut leaves, Valerian, Comfrey. Chinese herbal remedies: Jin Bu Huan, Ephedra, Shou Wu Pian, Bai Xian Pi.

=== Industrial toxin ===
Examples include arsenic, carbon tetrachloride, and vinyl chloride.

== Mechanism ==
Factors influencing
drug-induced hepatotoxicity
- Age
- Ethnicity and race
- Gender
- Nutritional status
- Underlying liver disease
- Renal function
- Pregnancy
- Duration and dosage of drug
- Enzyme induction
- Drug-to-drug interaction

Drugs continue to be taken off the market due to late discovery of hepatotoxicity. Due to its unique metabolism and close relationship with the gastrointestinal tract, the liver is susceptible to injury from drugs and other substances. 75% of blood coming to the liver arrives directly from gastrointestinal organs and the spleen via portal veins that bring drugs and xenobiotics in near-undiluted form. Several mechanisms are responsible for either inducing hepatic injury or worsening the damage process.

Many chemicals damage mitochondria, an intracellular organelle that produces energy. Its dysfunction releases excessive amount of oxidants that, in turn, injure hepatic cells. Activation of some enzymes in the cytochrome P-450 system such as CYP2E1 also lead to oxidative stress. Injury to hepatocyte and bile duct cells lead to accumulation of bile acid inside the liver. This promotes further liver damage. Non-parenchymal cells such as Kupffer cells, collagen-producing stellate cells, and leukocytes (i.e. neutrophil and monocyte) also have a role in the mechanism.

=== Drug metabolism in liver ===
Drug metabolism in liver: transferases are: glutathione, sulfate, acetate, glucoronic acid. P-450 is cytochrome P-450. Different pathways are shown for Drugs A, B and C.

The human body subjects most, but not all, compounds to various chemical processes (i.e. metabolism) to make them suitable for elimination. This involves chemical transformations to (a) reduce fat solubility and (b) to change biological activity. Although almost all tissues in the body have some ability to metabolize chemicals, smooth endoplasmic reticulum in the liver is the principal "metabolic clearing house" for both endogenous chemicals (e.g., cholesterol, steroid hormones, fatty acids, proteins) and exogenous substances (e.g., drugs, alcohol). The central role played by liver in the clearance and transformation of chemicals makes it susceptible to drug-induced injury.

Drug metabolism is usually divided into two phases: phase 1 and phase 2. Phase 1 reaction is generally speaking to prepare a drug for phase 2. However, many compounds can be metabolized by phase 2 directly or be excreted without any phase 2 reactions occurring. Phase 1 reaction involves oxidation, reduction, hydrolysis, hydration and many other rare chemical reactions. These processes tend to increase water solubility of the drug and can generate metabolites that are more chemically active and/or potentially toxic. Most of phase 2 reactions take place in cytosol and involve conjugation with endogenous compounds via transferase enzymes. Phase 1 are typically more suitable for elimination.

A group of enzymes located in the endoplasmic reticulum, known as cytochrome P-450, is the most important family of metabolizing enzymes in the liver. Cytochrome P-450 is not a single enzyme, but rather consists of a closely related family of 50 isoforms; six of them metabolize 90% of drugs. There is a tremendous diversity of individual P-450 gene products, and this heterogeneity allows the liver to perform oxidation on a vast array of chemicals (including most drugs) in phase 1. Three important characteristics of the P-450 system have roles in drug-induced toxicity:

1. Genetic diversity:

Each of the P-450 proteins is unique and accounts (to some extent) for the variation in drug metabolism between individuals. Genetic variations (polymorphism) in P-450 metabolism should be considered when patients exhibit unusual sensitivity or resistance to drug effects at normal doses. Such polymorphism is also responsible for variable drug response among patients of differing ethnic backgrounds.

2. Change in enzyme activity:

Potent inducers	Potent inhibitors	Substrates
Rifampicin, Carbamazepine, Phenobarbital, Phenytoin, St John's wort,	Amiodarone, Cimetidine, Ciprofloxacin, Fluconazole, Fluoxetine, Erythromycin, Isoniazid, Diltiazem	Caffeine, Clozapine, Omeprazole, Losartan, Theophylline

Many substances can influence the P-450 enzyme mechanism. Drugs interact with the enzyme family in several ways. Drugs that modify cytochrome P-450 enzyme are referred to as either inhibitors or inducers. Enzyme inhibitors block the metabolic activity of one or several P-450 enzymes. This effect usually occurs immediately. On the other hand, inducers increase P-450 activity by increasing enzyme production, or, in the case of CYP2E1, preventing degradation in the proteasome. There is usually a delay before enzyme activity increases.

3. Competitive inhibition:

Some drugs may share the same P-450 specificity and thus competitively block their biotransformation. This may lead to accumulation of drugs metabolized by the enzyme. This type of drug interaction may also reduce the rate of generation of toxic metabolites.

=== Patterns of injury ===
Patterns of drug-induced liver disease
Type of injury:	Hepatocellular	Cholestatic	Mixed
ALT	≥ Twofold rise	Normal	≥ Twofold rise
ALP	Normal	≥ Twofold rise	≥ Twofold rise
ALT: ALP ratio	High, ≥5	Low, ≤2	2–5
Examples	Acetaminophen; Allopurinol; Amiodarone; HAART; NSAID	Anabolic steroid Chlorpromazine; Clopidogrel; Erythromycin; Hormonal contraception	Amitriptyline, Enalapril; Carbamazepine; Sulfonamide; Phenytoin

Chemicals produce a wide variety of clinical and pathological hepatic injury. Biochemical markers (e.g. alanine transferase, alkaline phosphatase and bilirubin) are often used to indicate liver damage. Liver injury is defined as a rise in either (a) ALT level more than three times of upper limit of normal (ULN), (b) ALP level more than twice ULN, or (c) total bilirubin level more than twice ULN when associated with increased ALT or ALP. Liver damage is further characterized into hepatocellular (predominantly initial Alanine transferase elevation) and cholestatic (initial alkaline phosphatase rise) types. However they are not mutually exclusive and mixed types of injuries are often encountered.

Specific histo-pathological patterns of liver injury from drug-induced damage are discussed below.

==== Zonal necrosis ====
This is the most common type of drug-induced liver cell necrosis where the injury is largely confined to a particular zone of the liver lobule. It may manifest as a very high level of ALT and severe disturbance of liver function leading to acute liver failure.

Causes include:
Paracetamol, carbon tetrachloride

==== Hepatitis ====
In this pattern, hepatocellular necrosis is associated with infiltration of inflammatory cells. There can be three types of drug-induced hepatitis. (A) viral hepatitis is the most common, where histological features are similar to acute viral hepatitis. (B) in focal or non-specific hepatitis, scattered foci of cell necrosis may accompany lymphocytic infiltration. (C) chronic hepatitis is very similar to autoimmune hepatitis clinically, serologically, and histologically.

Causes:
(a) Viral hepatitis: Halothane, isoniazid, phenytoin
(b) Focal hepatitis: Aspirin
(c) Chronic hepatitis: Methyldopa, diclofenac

==== Cholestasis ====
Liver injury leads to impairment of bile flow and cases are predominated by itching and jaundice. Histology may show inflammation (cholestatic hepatitis) or it can be bland (without any parenchymal inflammation). On rare occasions, it can produce features similar to primary biliary cirrhosis due to progressive destruction of small bile ducts (vanishing duct syndrome).

Causes:
(a) Bland: Oral contraceptive pills, anabolic steroid, androgens
(b) Inflammatory: Allopurinol, co-amoxiclav, carbamazepine
(c) Ductal: Chlorpromazine, flucloxacillin

==== Steatosis ====
Hepatotoxicity may manifest as triglyceride accumulation, which leads to either small-droplet (microvesicular) or large-droplet (macrovesicular) fatty liver. There is a separate type of steatosis by which phospholipid accumulation leads to a pattern similar to the diseases with inherited phospholipid metabolism defects (e.g., Tay–Sachs disease)

Causes:
(a) Microvesicular: Aspirin (Reye's syndrome), ketoprofen, tetracycline (especially if expired)
(b) Macrovesicular: Acetaminophen, methotrexate
(c) Phospholipidosis: Amiodarone, total parenteral nutrition
(d) Antiviral: nucleoside analogues
(e) Corticosteroid
(f) Hormonal: Tamoxifen

==== Granuloma ====
Drug-induced hepatic granulomas are usually associated with granulomas in other tissues and patients typically have features of systemic vasculitis and hypersensitivity. More than 50 drugs have been implicated.

Causes:
Allopurinol, phenytoin, isoniazid, quinine, penicillin, quinidine

==== Vascular lesions ====
These result from injury to the vascular endothelium.

Causes:
Venoocclusive disease: Chemotherapeutic agents, bush tea
Peliosis hepatis: Anabolic steroids
Hepatic vein thrombosis: Oral contraceptives

==== Neoplasm ====
Neoplasms have been described with prolonged exposure to some medications or toxins. Hepatocellular carcinoma, angiosarcoma, and liver adenomas are the ones usually reported.

Causes:
Vinyl chloride, combined oral contraceptive pill, anabolic steroid, arsenic, thorotrast

== Diagnosis ==
Algorithm for suspected drug-induced hepatic toxicity

This remains a challenge in clinical practice due to a lack of reliable markers. Many other conditions lead to similar clinical as well as pathological pictures. To diagnose hepatotoxicity, a causal relationship between the use of the toxin or drug and subsequent liver damage has to be established, but might be difficult, especially when idiosyncratic reaction is suspected. Simultaneous use of multiple drugs may add to the complexity. As in acetaminophen toxicity, well established, dose-dependent, pharmacological hepatotoxicity is easier to spot. Several clinical scales such as CIOMS/RUCAM scale and Maria and Victorino criteria have been proposed to establish causal relationship between offending drug and liver damage. CIOMS/RUCAM scale involves a scoring system that categorizes the suspicion into "definite or highly probable" (score > 8), "probable" (score 6–8), "possible" (score 3–5), "unlikely" (score 1–2) and "excluded" (score ≤ 0). In clinical practice, physicians put more emphasis on the presence or absence of similarity between the biochemical profile of the patient and known biochemical profile of the suspected toxicity (e.g., cholestatic damage in amoxycillin-clavulanic acid).

== Treatment ==
In most cases, liver function will return to normal if the offending drug is stopped early. Additionally, the patient may require supportive treatment. In acetaminophen toxicity, however, the initial insult can be fatal. Fulminant hepatic failure from drug-induced hepatotoxicity may require liver transplantation. In the past, glucocorticoids in allergic features and ursodeoxycholic acid in cholestatic cases had been used, but there is no good evidence to support their effectiveness.

== Prognosis ==
An elevation in serum bilirubin level of more than 2 times ULN with associated transaminase rise indicates severe hepatotoxicity and is likely to lead to mortality in 10% to 15% of patients, especially if the offending drug is not stopped (Hy's Law). This is because it requires significant damage to the liver to impair bilirubin excretion, hence minor impairment (in the absence of biliary obstruction or Gilbert syndrome) would not lead to jaundice. Other poor predictors of outcome are old age, female sex, high AST.

== Drugs withdrawn ==
The following therapeutic drugs were withdrawn from the market primarily because of hepatotoxicity: Troglitazone, bromfenac, trovafloxacin, ebrotidine, nimesulide, nefazodone, ximelagatran and pemoline.

== See also ==
- Hepatoprotection
- Reye's syndrome
