= Mary Mann =

Mary Mann may refer to:

- Mary E. Mann (1848–1929), English novelist
- Mary Tyler Peabody Mann (1806–1887), American educator, wife of Horace Mann
- Mary Lou Clements-Mann (1946–1998), American biologist
