= International Law Association =

Non-profit organization

- Founded at: Brussels (Belgium)
- Location: London, WC1 (United Kingdom)
- Members: 4,525
- Secretary General: Antonios Tzanakopoulos
- President: Maria Gavouneli
- Chair: Christine Chinkin
- Treasurer: Rainer Hofmann
- Patron: Bruce Mauleverer
- Website: www.ila-hq.org

The International Law Association (ILA) is a non-profit organisation based in Great Britain that — according to its constitution — promotes "the study, clarification and development of international law" and "the furtherance of international understanding and respect for international law".

The ILA was founded in Brussels, Belgium, in 1873 and its present-day headquarters are in London. It is one of the oldest continuing organisations in the field of international law in the world and has consultative status, as an international non-governmental organisation, with a number of the United Nations-specialised agencies. Currently, the ILA has 20 active committees and 8 study groups that analyse specific facets of private and public international law. The findings of these groups are distributed to its members several times a year.

There are over 4,500 active ILA members around the world. The ILA's membership ranges from lawyers in private practices, academia, government and the judiciary, to non-lawyer experts from commercial, industrial and financial spheres, and representatives of bodies such as shipping and arbitration organisations and chambers of commerce.

The ILA holds biennial conferences and releases reports of the proceedings and recommendations of those conferences for use of the international community. ILA members as well as members of the public are allowed to participate in the conference. The 78th Biennial Conference of the ILA took place in August 2018 in Sydney, Australia. The 79th Biennial Conference was held in Kyoto, Japan from 23–27 August 2020.

Archives of the ILA are held at the Institute of Advanced Legal Studies, and contain records dating back from its early years, right up to the current century. The ILA was initially called the "Association for the Reform and Codification of the Law of Nations", switching to the present title of the "International Law Association" in 1895.

== Branches ==
The ILA operates through branches which can represent states as a whole or a group of states in a specific region. Each branch of the ILA is autonomous and operates individually. However, there is an Executive Council that is elected by all of the branches to oversee and approve the operations of the various branches of the ILA. There are currently 63 branches around the world. If there is not a branch available in a certain region, members of the public can become a member of ILA headquarters or request to establish a new branch location. This process requires endorsement from the ILA Executive Council.

== ILA Committees ==
The ILA is also split into various issue specific committees. Committees are created to allow the ILA to separate its work into various subcategories and assign a specific group of people to become experts in that issue area. The Committee mandates are established and reviewed every four years by the Executive Council's Director of Studies. There are currently 19 Committees whose areas of focus include international monetary law, global health law, space law, international law, and sea level rise. Each committee seeks to develop their area of law through research, surveys and reports to share their findings.

Committee membership is selected via nomination per branch. In order to be selected, the candidates must prove that they have significant expertise in that area as well as enthusiasm and willingness to contribute and actively work with the Committee. The nominees must be submitted to the ILA HQ for Executive Council approval. Each branch may also nominate one alternate for each appointed member in order to encourage more participation from less experienced ILA members. There is no requirement to have a representative from each branch in each committee, it is simply based on interest.

== Biennial International Law Conferences ==
Every two years the ILA holds an international law conference in order to further understanding and appreciation for international law. The conference serves as a forum to discuss current issues in the field, as well as to share reports and proposed resolutions to address and remedy those issues. Submitting resolution proposals must abide by the ILA Standing Orders of 2012. Once the ILA collects the reports and proposed resolutions from each committee, they are published on the ILA website for all to review prior to the conference.

In addition to attempting to improve the international legal landscape through resolutions, the conference serves as a networking event for scholars and colleagues in the international law field.

== Young Scholars and Practitioners ==
In addition to hosting Biennial and Regional Conferences, the ILA has formed a Scholarship Fund to assist graduate and postgraduate students with the financial aspect of attending said conferences. All who are interested in the field of international law are welcome to apply, however the Scholarship Fund is specifically meant for those without access to financial assistance, or the means to fund their attendance on their own.

Goals of the Scholarship Fund include reaching those who would not otherwise know about the ILA and it's work, as well as spreading awareness and access to under represented or underdeveloped countries. Since its founding in 2014, the Scholarship Fund has awarded 74 individuals the opportunity to attend either Regional or Biennial conferences.
