= Veronique Thouvenot =

Chilean scientist, medical doctor

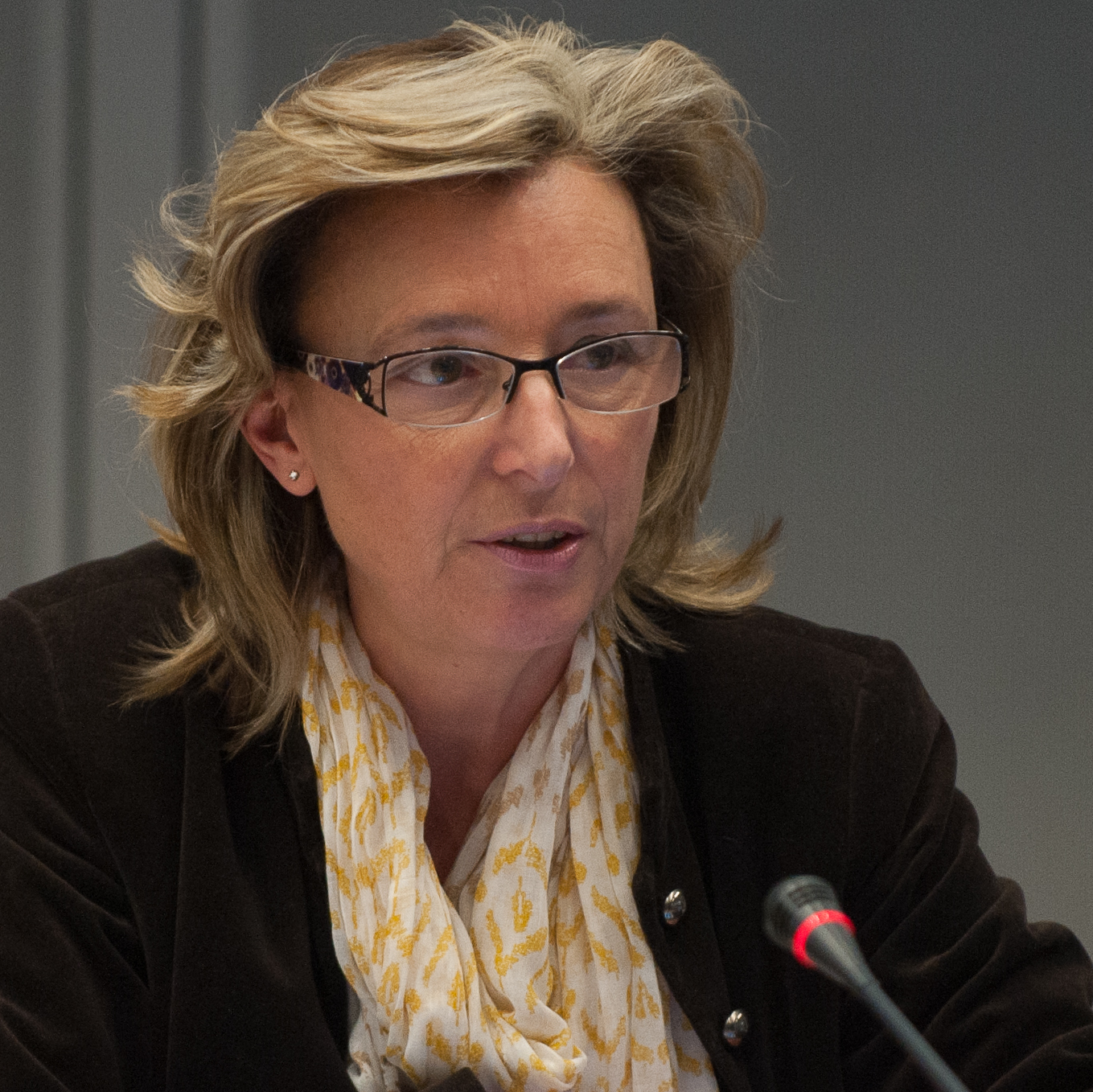
- Born: 1957 (age 68–69); Concepción, Chile
- Occupation: medical doctor
- Known for: BBC 100 Women in 2019

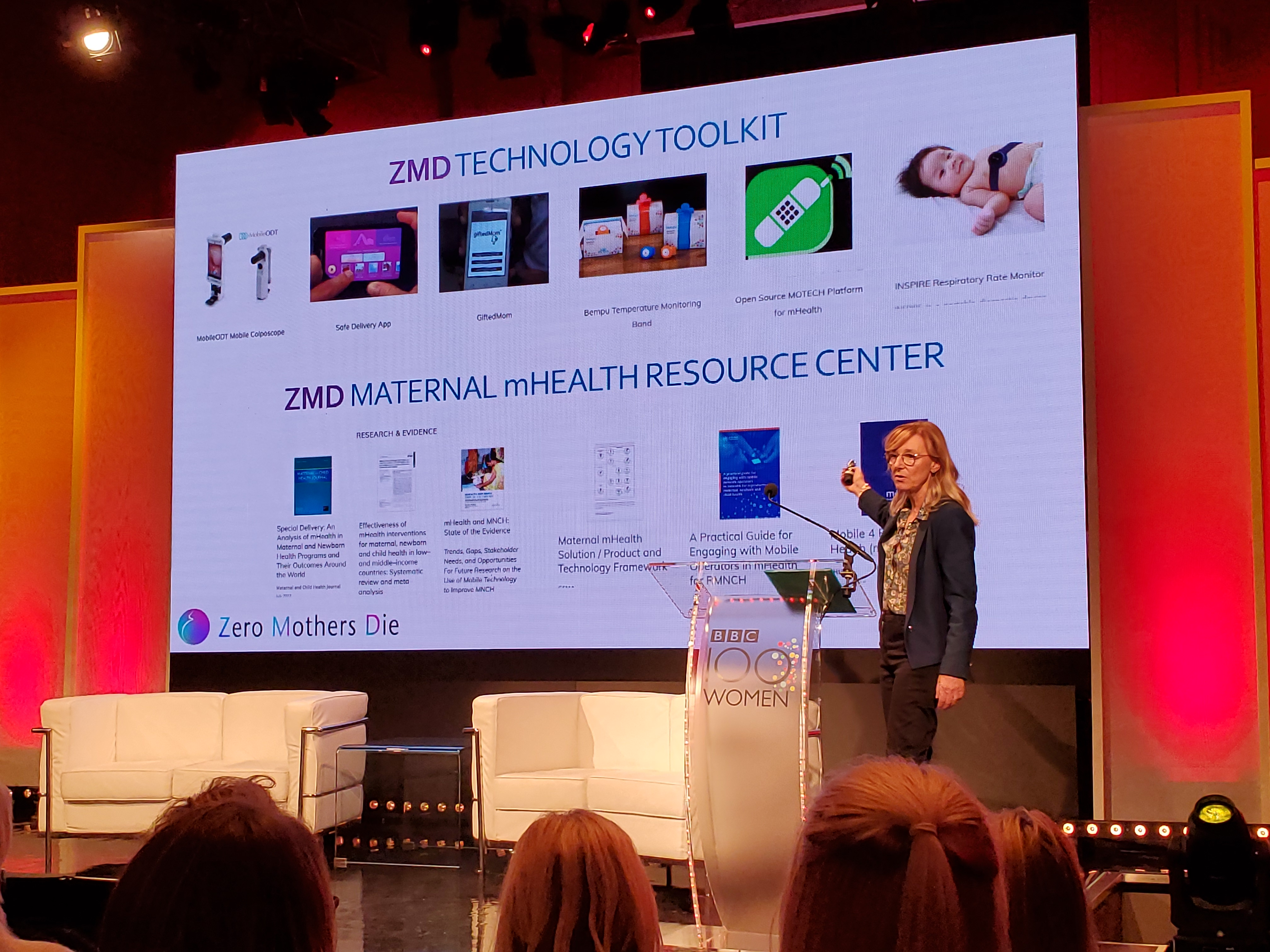
Véronique Thouvenot presenting at BBC 100 Women 2019 The Female Future London Conference at BBC Radio Theatre

Dr. Véronique Inès Thouvenot (born 1957) is a medical doctor, scientific director, and specialist in public and humanitarian health with a focus in eHealth and Telemedicine since 2002. She was named in BBC's 100 women, as one of the 100 inspiring and influential women from around the world for 2019. She is co-founder of Zero Mothers Die and Fundación Millenia2025 (Millennia2025 Women and Innovation Foundation) focused on women empowerment and equality, and has held senior positions at the United Nations and the World Health Organization.

Her work prominently involves the development and implementation of gender-based projects in developing nations with a focus on women's and maternal health. The primary objective of these projects is to enhance women's access to and use of eHealth and mHealth resources. Her efforts to combine technology with public health interventions have proven instrumental in addressing the maternal and child mortality crisis. By promoting access to healthcare information and fostering a connection between women and health workers, she significantly contributes to empowering women, enhancing their wellbeing, and advancing global health outcomes.

== Early life and career ==
Thouvenot was born in Concepción, Chile.

Thouvenot earned her Ph.D. in Advanced Mathematics and Decision Support Systems in Humanitarian Health. She also obtained an MBA with a concentration in Project Management. She holds postgraduate degrees in Medical Law and Health Economy, from the University of Medicine in Lyon, France.

She moved to Sweden where she started her medical practice. Thouvenot along with Jordi Serrano Pons and Coumba Touré founded Fundación Millenia2025 which is focused on empowering women. At the United Nations General Assembly (UNGA) in 2014, their foundation launched "Zero Mothers Die" maternal health app and provided women with mobile phones to access the app for information on pregnancies available in eight languages for free. She sees technology as a way to reduce the very high number of fatalities due to childbirth.

She was named in the BBC 100 Women (inspiring and influential women from around the world) in 2019 for her work in maternal health.

== Zero Mothers Die ==
Dr. Thouvenot is a co-founder of Zero Mothers Die, a campaign unveiled at a United Nations General Assembly event in September 2014 that uses information and communications technologies (including mobile technology) to deliver maternal, newborn and child health information.

For context, the World Health Organization estimates that about 260,000 women died during and following pregnancy and childbirth in 2023, and UN estimates indicate that about 4.8 million children died before the age of five in 2023; many deaths are preventable.

Zero Mothers Die has been described as using low-cost mobile technology to improve access to health information for women during pregnancy and the postnatal period. Mobile health and telemedicine are also used in maternal–fetal medicine in multiple settings worldwide.

The cornerstone of Zero Mothers Die lies in reducing maternal and child mortality rates. This is achieved by improving access to critical healthcare information for pregnant women. The initiative leverages mobile technologies to deliver voice and text messages in local languages and dialects, making health information both accessible and comprehensible for all women regardless of their literacy or linguistic background. One of the vital objectives of Zero Mothers Die is to boost mobile phone ownership and use among women, thereby reducing the mobile phone gender gap. The initiative takes an innovative approach by facilitating connections with healthcare workers through the allocation of free airtime that is specifically limited to calling local healthcare facilities and workers. This access empowers women with vital information and creates a direct channel of communication between them and the healthcare services they require.

In addition to the women themselves, Zero Mothers Die places a significant focus on community health workers. It uses tablets and smartphones equipped with tools to aid their work and deliver up-to-date training materials in local dialects. By doing so, the initiative contributes to improved maternal and child health at the community level.

== Publications ==
- Thouvenot V.I., Holmes K. Women and eHealth 2010 - 2015 JISfTeH
- Thouvenot V.I., Perez-Chavolla L., Coumel S., Zharavina D. The Women Observatory for eHealth, WeObservatory ISfTeH MEDETEL
- Thouvenot V.I. WeTelemed, le réseau global de femmes en télémédecine Journal International de Bioethique
- WeTelemed, le réseau global des femmes en télémédecine de la foundation Millennia2025 (2017)
- Applicaciones Digitales para Salud Materna e Infantil (book), 2016
- The Women Observatory for eHealth (WeObservatory) Develops an Intelligence MOOCs Commons for Women and eHealth (2015)
- Millennia Study 2015 "Women and eHealth 2010-2012" Networks and innovative programs (2014)
- The Women Observatory for eHealth, WeObservatory (2014)
- Zero Mothers Die (2014)
- Cómo hacer llegar la salud a las zonas más remotas utilizando Tecnologías de la Información y la Comunicación (2014)
