= Sarah MacCarthy =

American scientist

- Education: University of North Carolina at Chapel Hill; Harvard University
- Scientific career
- Fields: LGBTQ health studies
- Workplaces: RAND Corporation; University of Alabama at Birmingham
- Academic advisors: Sofia Gruskin

Sarah MacCarthy is an American scientist who is the inaugural holder of the Magic City LGBTQ Health Studies Endowed Chair at the University of Alabama at Birmingham. She is also an associate professor of health behavior.

== Life ==
MacCarthy grew up in Eswanti and Egypt and completed undergraduate studies at University of North Carolina at Chapel Hill. Her first job was formatting biosketches. She completed a M.S. in public health in 2007 with a focus in international public health and international health. In 2012, she obtained a Sc.D in international and global studies at the Harvard T.H. Chan School of Public Health. Sofia Gruskin was her mentor in graduate school. MacCarthy completed postdoctoral training at the Miriam Hospital.

MacCarthy worked at RAND Corporation for seven years in California before moving to the University of Alabama at Birmingham in 2021. Her research examines individual, programmatic, and policy-related aspects of sexual and gender minority health. She applies systematic mixed-methods research to address sexual and gender minority health in the United States and internationally.
