= Medicolegal =

Medicolegal is something that involves both medical and legal aspects, mainly:

- Medical jurisprudence, a branch of medicine
- Medical law, a branch of law
