= Council for International Organizations of Medical Sciences =

International non-governmental medical science organization

- Formation: 1949
- Headquarters: Geneva, Switzerland
- President: Hervé LeLouet
- Vice President: Samia Hurst
- Secretary-General: Lembit Rägo
- Website: https://cioms.ch

The Council for International Organizations of Medical Sciences (CIOMS) is an international non-governmental organization of 40 international, national, and associate member groups representing the biomedical science community. It was jointly established by the World Health Organization (WHO) and United Nations Educational, Scientific and Cultural Organization (UNESCO) in 1949 as a successor to the International Medical Congress that organized 17 conferences from 1867 until the 1913 outbreak of World War I.

The group's main goal is advancing public health by publishing guidelines on ethics, product development, and safety in medical research, such as the 2016 International Ethical Guidelines for Health-Related Research Involving Humans.

== Governance ==
The General Assembly of all CIOMS member organizations meets every year, alternating between in-person and teleconference formats, to elect the Executive Committee and its voting President. The Executive Committee of twelve representatives from national and international member groups meets at least one a year, appointing and guiding the Secretariat, consisting of the Secretary-General and their team in Geneva, Switzerland. The Executive Committee can invite non-voting ad hoc observers and technical experts.

== Round Tables and Working Groups ==
After its 1948 founding by UNESCO and the WHO as the Council for Coordination of International Medical Congresses, these UN specialized agencies funded its first conference in Brussels, Belgium. In 1952, the group was renamed as the Council for International Organizations of Medical Sciences (CIOMS) to reflect a focus on guiding member organizations that internally organize field-specific conferences. From 1967 to 1997, it organized annual round tables on medical science topics, offering a standardized conference format:

- I. Biomedical Science and the Dilemma of Human Experimentation Paris, France, 1967
- II. Heart Transplantation Geneva, Switzerland, 1968
- III. Evaluation of Drugs: Whose Responsibility? Liège, Belgium, 1968
- IV. Medical Research: Priorities and Responsibilities, Geneva, Switzerland, 1969
- V. Training of Research Workers in Medical Sciences, Geneva, Switzerland, 1970
- VI. Drug Abuse: Non-Medical Use of Dependence-Producing Drugs, Geneva, Switzerland, 1971
- VII. Recent Progress in Biology and Medicine: Its Social and Ethical Implications, Paris, France, 1972
- VIII. Protection of Human Rights in the Light of Scientific and Technological Progress in Biology and Medicine, Geneva, Switzerland, 1973
- IX. Medical Care and Society, Rio de Janeiro, Brazil, 1974
- X. Health Needs of Society: A Challenge for Medical Education Ulm, Germany, 1976
- XI. Trends and Prospects in Drug Research and Development, Geneva, Switzerland, 1977
- XII. Medical Ethics and the Protection of Human Rights Cascais, Portugal, 1978
- XIII. Economics and Health Policy, Geneva, Switzerland, 1979
- XIV. Medical Ethics and Medical Education, Mexico, 1980
- XV. Human Experimentation and Medical Ethics, Manila, Philippines, 1981
- XVI. Health for All – A Challenge to Research in Health Manpower Development, Ibadan, Nigeria, 1982
- XVII. Biomedical Research Involving Animals – Proposed International Guiding Principles, Geneva, Switzerland, 1983
- XVIII. Health Policy Ethics and Human Values: An International Dialogue, Athens, Greece, 1984
- XIV. Battered Children and Child Abuse, Berne, Switzerland, 1985
- XX. Health Manpower out of Balance. Conflicts and Prospects, Acapulco, Mexico 1986
- XXI. Health Policy, Ethics, and Human Values: European and North American Perspectives, Noordwijk, the Netherlands, 1987
- XXII. Ethics and Human Values in Family Planning, Bangkok, Thailand, 1988
- XXIII. Health Technology Transfer: Whose Responsibility? Geneva, Switzerland, 1989
- XXIV. Genetics, Ethics, and Human Values: Human Genome Mapping, Genetic Screening and Gene Therapy, Tokyo and Inuyama City, Japan, 1990
- XXV. Ethics and Epidemiology: International Guidelines, Geneva, Switzerland, 1990
- XXVI. Ethics and Research on Human Subjects. International Guidelines, Geneva, Switzerland, 1992
- XXVII. Drug Surveillance: International Cooperation – Past, Present, and Future, Geneva, Switzerland, 1993
- XXVIII. Poverty, Vulnerability, the Value of Human Life, and the Emergence of Bioethics, Ixtapa, Mexico, 1994
- The Declaration of Inuyama, a follow-up to the 1990 Conference, Inuyama and Nagayo, 1995
- XXIX. Ethics, Equity, and Health for All, Geneva, Switzerland, 1997

In 1990, CIOMS shifted to a format of assembling working groups of scientists from regulatory bodies, industry, and academia to meet for 2–4 years to reach consensus with other stakeholders and publish recommended guidelines. When the working groups are composed solely of CIOMS members, they are assigned a sequential identifier, whereas partnerships with outside groups are known by their specific topic:

- Working Group I (founded 1990): International Reporting of Adverse Drug Reactions
- Working Group II (founded 1992): International Reporting of Periodic Drug-Safety Update Summaries
- Working Group III (founded 1995): Guidelines for Preparing Core Clinical-Safety Information on Drugs
- Working Group IV (founded 1998): Benefit-Risk Balance for Marketed Drugs: Evaluation of Safety Signals
- Standardized Medical Dictionary for Regulatory Activities (MedDRA) Queries (founded 2002)
- Vaccine Pharmacovigilance (founded November 2005)
- Working Group VIII (founded September 2006): Signal Detection
- Working Group IX (founded April 2010): Risk Minimization
- Working Group X (founded September 2010): Meta-Analysis
- Bioethics (founded 2011)
- Vaccine Safety (founded 2013)
- Drug-Induced Liver Injury (founded April 2017)
- Clinical Research in Resource-Limited Settings (founded November 2017)
- Working Group XI (founded April 2018): Patient Involvement in the Development, Regulation and Safe Use of Medicines
- Expert Working Group on MedDRA Labeling Groupings (founded April 2019)
- Working Group XII (founded September 2019): Benefit-Risk Balance for Medicinal Products
- Working Group XIII (founded March 2020): Real-World Data and Real-World Evidence in Regulatory Decision Making
- International Guidelines on Good Governance Practice for Research Institutions (founded July 2021)
- Working Group XIV (founded May 2022): Artificial Intelligence in Pharmacovigilance
- Working Group XV: Realising the Potential of Pharmacoepidemiology for Public Health Decision-Making (founded November 2023)*
- Working Group XVI: Development Safety Update Report (founded February 2025)*
- Working Group XVII: Long-term safety of medicinal products (founded December 2025)*

Titles marked with * are not yet published (still work in progress)

== Publications ==
In March 1959, Austin Bradford Hill, then director of the UK Medical Research Council's Statistical Research Unit, chaired a Vienna-based CIOMS conference on controlled clinical trials. The proceedings, published in 1960, commented on research ethics, experimental design, and statistical analysis. Hill would later outline "Bradford Hill criteria" for establishing causal relationships between statistically correlated phenomena.

This publication laid the groundwork for CIOMS' 1982, 1993, 2002, 2009, and 2016 versions of International Ethical Guidelines for Health-Related Research Involving Humans. These guidelines have been praised for including diverse stakeholders from low- and middle-income countries, compared to the Declaration of Helsinki written by physicians of the World Medical Association. While neither of these documents are legally binding like the Council of Europe's Oviedo Convention, their role as recommended guidelines avoids ethical imperialism.

The first CIOMS working group produced a reporting form for adverse drug reactions, which shaped the International Council for Harmonisation of Technical Requirements for Pharmaceuticals for Human Use (ICH)'s E2B guideline. The International Organization for Standardization (ISO), European Committee for Standardization (CEN), and Health Level Seven International (HL7) used these guidelines in publishing the ISO/HL7 27953:2011 standards on Health Informatics: Individual Case Safety Reports (ICSRs) in Pharmacovigilance.

== Membership ==
=== International Members ===
- International College of Angiology
- International Federation of Associations of Pharmaceutical Physicians and Pharmaceutical Medicine
- International Federation of Otorhinolaryngological Societies
- International Rhinologic Society
- International Society of Internal Medicine
- International Society of Pharmacoepidemiology
- International Society of Pharmacovigilance
- International Union of Basic and Clinical Pharmacology
- Medical Women's International Association
- World Allergy Organization
- World Association of Societies of Pathology and Laboratory Medicine
- World Medical Association
- European Network of Research Ethics Committees (EUREC)

=== National Members ===
- Bangladesh, Bangladesh Medical Research Council
- Belgium, Royal Academy of Medicine of Belgium
- Czech Republic, Czech Medical Association
- Georgia, Georgian Society of Pharmacology
- Germany, Association of the Scientific Medical Societies in Germany
- India, Indian Council of Medical Research
- Israel, The Israel Academy of Sciences and Humanities
- Republic of Korea, Korean Academy of Medical Sciences
- South Africa, South African Medical Research Council
- Switzerland, Swiss Academy of Medical Sciences

=== Associate Members ===
- American Society for Bioethics and Humanities
- Asia Pacific Academy of Ophthalmology
- Consulta di Bioetica
- Federation of Polish Medical Organizations Abroad
- Good Clinical Practice Alliance
- International Council for Laboratory Animal Science
- International Federation of Clinical Chemistry and Laboratory Medicine
- International Federation of Medical Students' Associations
- International Medical Sciences Academy
- International Society of Hepatic Encephalopathies & Nitrogen Metabolism
- International Union of Microbiological Societies
- International Union of Physiological Sciences
- Medical Sciences Society of Queensland University, Haiti
- National Fund for Scientific Research
- Saudi Neonatology Society
- World Association for Medical Law
- World Federation of Chiropractic
- World Organization of Family Doctors

== See also ==
- CIOMS/RUCAM scale
- Pharmacovigilance
- Clinical trial
- Regulation of therapeutic goods
