= Alexandra Phelan =

International law and global health security researcher

- Education: Monash University (BS, LLB); Australian National University (LLM); Georgetown University (SJD)
- Scientific career
- Fields: International law, Human rights, Health security, Climate change
- Workplaces: Georgetown University (2014–2023); Johns Hopkins University (2023–present)
- Doctoral advisor: Larry Gostin
- Website: Faculty website

Alexandra Louise Phelan is an associate professor at Johns Hopkins Bloomberg School of Public Health and senior scholar at the Johns Hopkins Center for Health Security. She specializes in international legal and policy issues that are related to emerging and reemerging infectious diseases, including upstream drivers of disease emergence like climate change.

== Education and early career ==
Phelan attended Eltham College before attending Monash University in Melbourne, Australia where she received her Bachelor of Science degree in Biomedical Sciences in 2006 and her Bachelor of Laws degree in 2009, focusing on human rights and health security. There, she published an honors thesis entitled Implementing Australia's health security legislation: international obligations, validity and human rights, which examined Australia's implementation of the 2005 International Health Regulations.

For her graduate work, Phelan attended The Australian National University, where she received her Master of Laws degree in 2013, specializing in international law and global health security. During that time, she also worked as a solicitor at King & Wood Mallesons and was admitted to practice in 2010 to the Supreme Court of Victoria and High Court of Australia. In 2013, she moved to the United States to attend Georgetown University Law Center, where she completed her Doctorate of Law (S.J.D.) degree in 2019 under the mentorship of legal scholar Lawrence O. Gostin. Her doctoral work investigated how international law can facilitate response to and prevention of infectious diseases.

== Research and career ==
Phelan joined the faculty at Johns Hopkins University as a senior scholar at the Johns Hopkins Center for Health Security and associate professor in the Department of Environmental Health and Engineering at Johns Hopkins Bloomberg School of Public Health. There, she continues her research on international legal and policy issues surrounding infectious diseases around the world, which have included Ebola, Zika, and COVID-19, and Planetary health issues. Her research also factors in concerns around human rights and the Right to health in approaches to deal with infectious disease prevention, preparedness, and response. For example, she was critical of a rule proposed by the Centers for Disease Control and Prevention in 2016 that would expand its powers to screen, test, and quarantine people traveling in the United States during a disease outbreak without procedural protections. Instead, she proposed adding in basic due process steps to ensure the proper checks and balances that would respect civil liberties.

She currently serves on the National Academy of Sciences Standing Committee on Emerging Infectious Diseases, which is currently advising the government on the rapidly developing science and policy issues around the COVID-19 pandemic. She is also a consultant for the World Health Organization and the World Bank Group and was formerly a consultant for GAVI.

Prior to Johns Hopkins University, Phelan was a member of faculty at Georgetown University as part of the Center for Global Health Science and Security at Georgetown University School of Medicine, as an assistant professor in the Department of Microbiology and Immunology, and as an adjunct professor of law at Georgetown University Law Center.

=== Work on the Ebola epidemic ===
Phelan was involved with the public health response that took place during the Western African Ebola virus epidemic, as well as with subsequent outbreaks of Ebola in Africa, consulting for both the World Health Organization and affected countries. During the initial outbreak, she co-authored a recommendation to the United Nations, advocating for the need for a Security Council Resolution to ensure peace and security in light of the epidemic, noting the disease could exacerbate political unrest in affected countries. She later authored a legal analysis of the United States response to the epidemic, offering legal solutions to gaps in pandemic preparedness. In February 2019, she and her colleagues called for the WHO to declare the epidemic in the Democratic Republic of Congo a Public Health Emergency of International Concern in order to galvanize the international community to provide political, financial, and technical support to prevent the disease from spreading further. The WHO ultimately made the declaration in July 2019, several months after the initial call to action.

=== Work on COVID-19 ===
Phelan has been monitoring the emergence of the COVID-19 pandemic since the disease began to emerge in Wuhan in late 2019. In late January 2020, she advocated that the WHO should declare the novel coronavirus a Public Health Emergency of International Concern (PHEIC) as a signal to the international community to launch a coordinated public health response.

Phelan has also been critical of reports that Chinese officials cordon sanitaire in the Hubei Province, forcing the quarantine of those in the region. She notes that the Liberian government's forced quarantine of 60 to 120 thousand people in West Point, Monrovia during the 2014 Ebola outbreak led to violence and public mistrust that exacerbated the spread of the virus. The lockdown may have also limited access to medical supplies and overburdened hospitals during a critical time, so Phelan has also advocated for an investigation into the impact of the forced lockdown. Phelan has asserted that cultivating public trust, while also preserving human rights, is essential for combatting the growing crisis. She also cautioned the United States against initiating a travel ban on people from countries affected by the novel coronavirus, as bans can break international trust.

As the crisis has grown, Phelan and her colleagues have developed a set of recommendations for ensuring COVID-19 control measures are both equitable and inclusive to respect the needs of vulnerable populations, both in terms of increasing access to testing and treatment, as well as access to reliable and timely information. They argue that failure to take such an approach will undermine response efforts to the pandemic, eroding trust among these marginalized communities and frontline healthcare workers.

=== Key publications ===
- "Covid-19: control measures must be equitable and inclusive." BMJ 2020; 368 doi:10.1136/bmj.m1141
- "The novel coronavirus originating in Wuhan, China: challenges for global health governance." JAMA 2020;323(8):709-710. doi:10.1001/jama.2020.1097
- "The Ebola Epidemic: A public health emergency." JAMA 2014;312(11):1095-1096. doi:10.1001/jama.2014.11176

== Awards and honors ==
- Top 100 Women of Influence, The Australian Financial Review, 2019
- Emerging Leader in Biosecurity, Center for Health Security, 2015
- Associate Fellow, Royal Commonwealth Society, 2015
