= Model State Emergency Health Powers Act =

Public health act

The Model State Emergency Health Powers Act (MSEHPA) is a public health act originally drafted by the Centers for Disease Control and Prevention to aid the United States' state legislatures in revising their public health laws to control epidemics and respond to bioterrorism. The CDC's draft was revised by the Center for Law and the Public's Health, a collaboration between Georgetown University and Johns Hopkins University. By December 21, 2001, the act was released to state legislatures for review and approval. Critics immediately charged that the MSEHPA failed to protect the general public from abuses arising from the tremendous powers it would grant individual states in an emergency. The MSEHPA provisions also went beyond the scope of addressing bioterrorism while disregarding medical privacy standards. As of August 1, 2011, forty states have passed various forms of MSEHPA legislation.

== Draft ==
The initial public health emergency proposal was drafted by the CDC in 1999. Still in the CDC's draft form, Lawrence O. Gostin, an attorney and professor at Georgetown University in Washington, D.C. began reworking the document during the anthrax letter attacks in 2001, using funds provided by the CDC. Gostin's produced a preliminary draft on October 23, before releasing a second draft in December 2001. Gostin stated that it took him three to four weeks to prepare the act.

The preliminary draft named the National Governors Association, the National Conference of State Legislatures, the National Association of Attorneys General, the Association of State and Territorial Health Officials, and the National Association of County and City Health Officials as collaborators without Gostin contacting them. The second draft, dated December 21, 2001, made the revised statement on its title page that the law was a "draft for discussion … to assist" those organizations.

== Criticism ==
The Association of American Physicians and Surgeons claimed that the draft used sweeping language to the extent that it "could turn governors into dictators" since the MSEHPA gave governors the authority to declare public health emergencies, and afterward force vaccinations on the general public without their informed consent. The deployment of state National Guards could be used to administer the vaccines or substances. Legal liabilities for drug companies which manufactured the vaccines and/or substances were removed. ACT-UP/San Francisco protested the MSEHPA, stating it was a potential assault on gay men who could be rounded up en masse as vectors of disease, and the leaders of ACT-UP were jailed for three months on anti-terrorism charges for their protest.

In 2002, the public strongly criticized a similar but federal version of MSEHPA, folded into Section 304 of the Homeland Security Act. Of concern was Sidney Taurel's seat on the Homeland Security Advisory Council and his influence in creating what was commonly referred to as the Lilly Rider, those HSA provisions which protected Eli Lilly and Company and other drug manufacturers against legal liabilities. The primary difference between HSA provisions and MSEHPA provisions was that traditional state control of public health concerns was removed and replaced by federal health department control. The Department of Homeland Security would declare public health emergencies instead of governors, and be responsible for enacting forced vaccinations without informed consent. The HSA was passed by Congress, but Section 304 was struck from the bill in 2003.

Phyllis Schlafly called the MSEHPA "an unprecedented assault on the constitutional rights of the American people."

=== Defence ===
Attorneys Jason W. Sapsin, Stephen P. Teret; Scott Burris, Julie Samia Mair, James G. Hodge Jr, Jon S. Vernick and Gostin wrote in an article in the August 2002 issue of the Journal of the American Medical Assn., that "Provided those powers are bounded by legal safeguards, individuals should be required to yield some of their autonomy, liberty, or property to protect the health and security of the community."

== Current status ==
As of 2007, 33 states had introduced 133 legislative bills or resolutions that were based upon or featured provisions related to the articles or sections of the act. Of these, 48 had passed.
