= Ebrotidine =

Chemical compound

Clinical data
- Routes of administration: Oral

Identifiers
- IUPAC name: N-(4-bromophenyl)sulfonyl-N'-[2-[[2-(diaminomethylideneamino)-1,3-thiazol-4-yl]methylsulfanyl]ethyl]methanimidamide
- CAS Number: 100981-43-9
- PubChem CID: 65869
- ChemSpider: 59279
- UNII: TMZ3IBW2OW
- ChEMBL: ChEMBL1742471
- CompTox Dashboard (EPA): DTXSID80143601

Chemical and physical data
- Formula: C_{14}H_{17}BrN_{6}O_{2}S_{3}
- Molar mass: 477.41 g·mol^{−1}
- 3D model (JSmol): Interactive image
- SMILES: Brc1ccc(cc1)S(=O)(=O)N/C=N/CCSCc2csc(n2)N=C(N)N
- InChI: InChI=1S/C14H17BrN6O2S3/c15-10-1-3-12(4-2-10)26(22,23)19-9-18-5-6-24-7-11-8-25-14(20-11)21-13(16)17/h1-4,8-9H,5-7H2,(H,18,19)(H4,16,17,20,21); Key:ZQHFZHPUZXNPMF-UHFFFAOYSA-N

Ebrotidine is an H_{2} receptor antagonist with gastroprotective activity against ethanol-, aspirin- or stress-induced gastric mucosal damage. The antisecretory properties of ebrotidine are similar to those of ranitidine, and approximately 10-fold greater than those of cimetidine. Ebrotidine has anti-Helicobacter pylori activity via inhibition of the urease enzyme and the proteolytic and mucolytic activities of the bacterium. However, its activity is synergistic with a number of antibacterial agents. Ebrotidine counteracts the inhibitory effects of H. pylori lipopolysaccharides. Ebrotidine was withdrawn from the market due to risks of hepatotoxicity.

Ebrotidine has been shown to be as effective as ranitidine for the treatment of gastric or duodenal ulcers or erosive reflux oesophagitis, with significantly better ulcer healing rates (albeit inexplicably) in those who smoke.
