= Jonathan Mann (physician) =

American WHO administrator (1947–1998)

- Born: Jonathan Max Mann; July 30, 1947; Boston, Massachusetts, U.S.
- Died: September 2, 1998 (aged 51); Atlantic Ocean, off St. Margarets Bay, Nova Scotia, Canada
- Education: Harvard College; Washington University School of Medicine; Harvard School of Public Health
- Known for: Administrator for the World Health Organization
- Spouse(s): Marie-Paule Bondat (1970–1995; divorced); Mary Lou Clements-Mann (1996–1998; their deaths)
- Children: Lydia Kline, Naomi Mann-Gallagher, and Aaron Mann
- Awards: Calderone Prize (1994)

Jonathan Max Mann (July 30, 1947 – September 2, 1998) was an American physician who was an administrator for the World Health Organization, and spearheaded early AIDS research in the 1980s.

== Education ==
Mann was president of the National Honor Society in the Newton South High School class of 1965. He earned his B.A. magna cum laude from Harvard College, his M.D. from Washington University in St. Louis in 1974, and the degree of M.P.H. from the Harvard School of Public Health in 1980.

== Career ==
Mann joined the Centers for Disease Control in 1975, staying there until 1977 when he became the State Epidemiologist for New Mexico, until 1984.

Mann moved to Zaire in March 1984 as a founder of Project SIDA, an effort to study AIDS in Africa, after being recruited by fellow epidemiologist Joseph B. McCormick. In 1986 he founded the WHO's Global Programme for AIDS, resigning this post in 1990 to protest the lack of response from the United Nations with regard to AIDS, and the actions of the then WHO director-general Hiroshi Nakajima.

In 1990, Mann founded the health and human rights organization HealthRight International (initially known as Doctors of the World-USA), to fill a void he perceived amongst the health and human rights organizations in the United States and to create a unique organization whose mission was to create sustainable programs that promote and protect health and human rights in the United States and abroad.

Mann directed the launch in 1994 of the Health and Human Rights journal, published by the François Xavier Bagnoud Center for Health and Human Rights, which he also helped to establish. Mann was also a professor of epidemiology at Harvard's School of Public Health.

== Promoting health and human rights ==
Mann was a pioneer in advocating combining public health, ethics and human rights. He theorized and actively promoted the idea that human health and human rights are integrally and inextricably connected, arguing that these fields overlap in their respective philosophies and objectives to improve health, well-being, and to prevent premature death.

Mann proposed a three-pronged approach to the fundamental issue of the relationship between health and human rights. First, health is a human rights issue. Secondly (and conversely), human rights are a health issue. Human rights violations result in adverse health effects. Thirdly, linkages exist between health and human rights (a hypothesis to be rigorously tested). Literature substantiates the effects of the first two points, but Mann and colleagues proceeded to call for the validation of the third point and challenged the world to practice it. His work led to the development of the Four-Step Impact Assessment, a multi-disciplinary approach of evaluating interdependent and overlapping elements of both disciplines of human rights and Public Health.

With this framework, Mann attempted to bridge a perceived gap of philosophies, correspondence and vocabulary, education and training, recruitment, and work methods between the disciplines of bioethics, jurisprudence, public health law and epidemiology. Furthermore, Mann knew that the history of "conflictual relationships" between public health officials and civil liberties workers presented challenges to the pursuit of what he called a “powerful” confluence of health and human rights – a positive approach.

== Death ==
Mann was among the passengers of Swissair Flight 111 crash in 1998 along with his second wife, AIDS researcher Mary Lou Clements-Mann. None of the 229 people on board survived. At the time of his death, Mann was the dean of the Allegheny University School of Public Health (now Drexel University School of Public Health) in Philadelphia.

== Bibliography ==
- Gorna, Robin; Mann, Jonathan M. (1996). Vamps, Virgins, and Victims: How Can Women Fight AIDS?. Cassell. ISBN 978-0-304-32809-3.
- Mann, Jonathan M.; Gruskin, S.; Grodin, M. A.; Annas, G. J., eds. (1999). Health and Human Rights: A Reader. New York: Routledge. ISBN 978-0-415-92102-2.
- Mann, Jonathan M.; Tarantola, D. (1996). AIDS in the World II: Global Dimensions, Social Roots, and Responses. Oxford University Press. ISBN 978-0-19-509097-0.
