= Health and Human Rights =

- Discipline: Public health, human rights
- Language: English
- Edited by: Joseph Amon

Publication details
- History: 1994–present
- Publisher: Harvard University Press (United States)
- Frequency: Biannually
- Open access: Yes
- Impact factor: 1.407 (2018)

Standard abbreviations
- ISO 4: Health Hum. Rights

Indexing
- CODEN: HHRIF4
- ISSN: 1079-0969 (print); 2150-4113 (web)
- LCCN: 94648723
- JSTOR: 10790969
- OCLC no.: 243563202

Links
- Journal homepage; Online access; Online archive

Health and Human Rights is a biannual peer-reviewed public health journal that was established in 1994. It covers research on the conceptual foundations of human rights and social justice in relation to health. The founding editor-in-chief was Jonathan Mann, who was succeeded by Sofia Gruskin in 1997. Since 2023, the journal is edited by Joseph Amon. Harvard University Press became the publisher of the journal in 2013, succeeding the François-Xavier Bagnoud Center for Health and Human Rights at Harvard School of Public Health.

The journal transitioned to an online open-access publication in the summer of 2008. It includes two sections: "Critical Concepts" and "Health and Human Rights in Practice". The first focuses on the conceptual foundations and challenges of rights discourse and action in relation to health. The second encourages and promotes new voices from the field—highlighting the innovative work of groups and individuals in direct engagement with human rights struggles as they relate to health.
