= CIOMS/RUCAM scale =

- Purpose: ascertain if liver problems are due to medication

The CIOMS/RUCAM scale is a tool to predict whether liver damage can be attributed to a particular medication.

== Hepatotoxicity ==
Determining hepatotoxicity (toxic effects of a substance on the liver) remains a major challenge in clinical practice due to lack of reliable markers. Many other conditions lead to similar clinical as well as pathological picture. To diagnose hepatotoxicity, a causal relationship between the use of the toxin or drug and subsequent liver damage has to be established, but might be difficult, especially when idiosyncratic reaction is suspected.

== Interpretation ==
The CIOMS/RUCAM scale has been proposed to establish causal relationship between offending drug and liver damage. The CIOMS/RUCAM scale involves a scoring system which categorizes the suspicion into "definite or highly probable" (score > 8), "probable" (score 6-8), "possible" (score 3-5), "unlikely" (score 1-2) and "excluded" (score ≤ 0). In clinical practice physicians put more emphasis on the presence or absence of similarity between the biochemical profile of the patient and known biochemical profile of the suspected toxicity (e.g. cholestatic damage in amoxycillin-clavulanic acid).
