= Daniel Tarantola =

French world health official

- Born: 1942 (age 83–84); Ajaccio, France
- Education: Université de Paris

Daniel Tarantola (born 1942) was born in Ajaccio (Corsica), France, in 1942. Having obtained his medical degree from Paris University, Tarantola began an international health career in 1971 in the context of emergency humanitarian medical missions to Biafra (Nigeria), and Peru. He was engaged in a movement with Bernard Kouchner which resulted in the foundation of Médecins Sans Frontières, of which he was the first physician working in the field (1973, Burkina Faso). Early in his career, Tarantola worked over almost two decades with the World Health Organization (WHO) on large scale international health programmes, including the eradication of smallpox from Bangladesh (1974–1978), childhood disease control programmes (1979–1984), the Expanded Programme on Immunization, the Control of Diarrhoeal Diseases Programme, the Acute Respiratory Infections Programme and as a senior member of the team who designed and started the launching of the WHO Global programme on HIV/AIDS (1987–1990).

Having left WHO in 1991, Tarantola was over a period of eight years a lecturer in the Department of Population and International Health of the Harvard School of Public Health and a Senior Associate of the Harvard-based François-Xavier Bagnoud Center for Health and Human Rights. With Jonathan Mann, with whom he was closely associated over a period of twelve years, he co-authored and co-edited a number of publications including two volumes of AIDS in the World, in 1992 and 1996, respectively. While Mann is the person most associated with the movement that seeks to integrate public health and human rights by conceptualizing them as interdependent, it is fair to say that in a less public manner Tarantola played (and continues to play) an equally key role in working to establish 'health and human rights' as integral to the on-the-ground work of IGOs, states, and NGOs.

From 1998–2004, Tarantola rejoined the WHO headquarters in Geneva as a Senior Policy Adviser to the Director General with a specific focus on health and human rights, HIV/AIDS and communicable diseases, and family health. Additionally during the latter part of this period, Tarantola occupied the function of Director of the WHO Department of Immunization, Vaccines and Biologicals.

In 2005, upon retiring from the WHO, Tarantola took up a professorship at the University of New South Wales, Sydney, Australia, leading a cross-Faculty research initiative on Health and Human Rights involving the Faculties of Medicine, Law and Arts and Social Sciences. In 2010, Tarantola relocated to his own country, France. His current work aims at exploring the interface and synergies between health, development and human rights as they relate, among other topics, to: HIV, Hepatitis C, poverty and human development, climate change, indigenous populations, migration, refugees and post-disaster impact mitigation. He continues to be very active in the field of immunization for which he chairs a number of programme evaluations and strategic planning.
