= Mary Lou Clements-Mann =

American biologist

- Born: Mary Lou Clements; September 17, 1946; Longview, Texas, U.S.
- Died: September 2, 1998 (aged 51); Atlantic Ocean, off St. Margarets Bay, Nova Scotia, Canada
- Education: Texas Tech University; University of Texas Southwestern Medical School; University of London; Johns Hopkins University
- Known for: Head of the Division of Vaccine Sciences in the Department of International Health at the Johns Hopkins Bloomberg School of Public Health
- Spouse: Jonathan Mann (1996–1998; their deaths)

Mary Lou Clements-Mann (September 17, 1946 – September 2, 1998) was the founder and first Director of the Center for Immunization Research at the Johns Hopkins Bloomberg School of Public Health and is well known for her work in the areas of HIV and influenza vaccine research.

== Education ==
Clements-Mann graduated from Texas Tech University in 1968 and received her medical degree from the University of Texas Southwestern Medical School in 1972. She also received a doctorate in tropical medicine from the University of London in 1975 and a master's degree in public health, specifically epidemiology, from Johns Hopkins University in 1979.

== Career ==
Beginning in 1975, Clements-Mann worked as consultant to the World Health Organization's Smallpox Eradication Program in India. Later, she was an assistant professor at the University of Maryland School of Medicine from 1979 to 1985. During this time, she joined the university's Center for Vaccine Development. She later became the chief of the clinical studies section in 1985. Clements-Mann served as a member of the medical staff at Johns Hopkins Hospital and Bayview Medical Center. In 1990, she was granted tenure as a professor in the department of international health with a joint appointment in the immunology and molecular biology departments.

She was a member of the US Centers for Disease Control Advisory Committee on the Children's Vaccine Initiative and the World Health Organization's steering committee for HIV vaccine development.

Throughout her career, Clements-Mann developed an extensive bibliography with papers on vaccines for influenza, HIV, cholera, hepatitis B, respiratory syncytial virus, parainfluenza, Rocky Mountain spotted fever, rotavirus, E. coli, and typhoid.

== Personal life and death ==
Clements-Mann married Jonathan Mann in December 1996. She died in the 1998 crash of Swissair Flight 111 with her husband while traveling to a World Health Organization meeting in Geneva.
