= George Annas =

American legal, ethical, and public health scholar

- Born: George Joseph Annas Jr. July 13, 1945; St. Cloud, Minnesota, US
- Died: May 30, 2025 (aged 79); Boston, Massachusetts, US
- Spouse: Mary Frances Roche (m. 1969; died 2024)
- Children: 2

Academic background
- Education: Harvard University (BA, JD, MPH)

Academic work
- Main interests: Health law, bioethics and human rights
- Notable works: The rights of patients

Notes
- Cofounder of Global Lawyers and Physicians

George Joseph Annas Jr. (July 13, 1945 – May 30, 2025) was an American scholar and ethicist. He was the William Fairfield Warren Distinguished Professor and Director of the Center for Health Law, Ethics & Human Rights at the Boston University School of Public Health, School of Medicine, and School of Law.

== Biography ==
Annas was born in St. Cloud, Minnesota on July 13, 1945. He held a bachelor's degree in economics from Harvard College, a J.D. from Harvard Law School and an M.P.H. from the Harvard School of Public Health, where he was a Joseph P. Kennedy Fellow in Medical Ethics. He worked in the fields of health law, bioethics, and human rights.

Annas was the cofounder of Global Lawyers and Physicians, a transnational professional NGO that states it is dedicated to promoting human rights and health. He taught health law and human rights courses in the Boston University School of Public Health, the Boston University School of Law, and the Boston University School of Medicine. He was a Hastings Center fellow, a former member of the National Academy of Medicine, a fellow of the American Association for the Advancement of Sciences, and a member of the National Academies' Committee on Human Rights.

Annas was married for 55 years to Mary Frances Roche, who died in October 2024. They had two children, Katie, an attorney, and David, a forensic psychiatrist.

Annas died at the age of 79 at a hospital in Boston, Massachusetts on May 30, 2025, after a recent cancer diagnosis.

== Selected bibliography ==
=== Books ===
- Annas, George J. (1988). Judging medicine. Clifton, New Jersey: Humana Press. ISBN 9780896031326.
- Annas, George J. (1989). The rights of patients: the basic ACLU guide to patient rights (2nd ed.). Carbondale: Southern Illinois University Press. ISBN 9780809315277.
- Annas, George J.; Grodin, Michael A. (1992). The Nazi doctors and the Nuremberg Code: human rights in human experimentation. New York, New York: Oxford University Press. ISBN 9780195101065.

Book review: Yarmolinsky, Adam (13 May 1993). "Book Review The Nazi Doctors and the Nuremberg Code: Human Rights in Human Experimentation Edited by George J. Annas and Michael A. Grodin. 371 pp. New York, Oxford University Press, 1992. $29.95. 0-19-507042-9". New England Journal of Medicine. 328 (19): 1429–1430. doi:10.1056/NEJM199305133281922. ISSN 0028-4793.

- Annas, George J. (1998). Some choice: law, medicine, and the market. New York: Oxford University Press. ISBN 9780195118322.
- Annas, George J.; Grodin, Michael A.; Mann, Jonathan M.; Gruskin, Sofia (1999). Health and human rights: a reader. New York: Routledge. ISBN 9780415921022.

Book review: Burke, Nora (August 2001). "Health and Human Rights (review)". Human Rights Quarterly. 23 (3): 846–851. doi:10.1353/hrq.2001.0029. S2CID 143663668. Selected as second of the top ten humanitarian books of 1999.

- Annas, George J. (2005). American bioethics: crossing human rights and health law boundaries. Oxford New York: Oxford University Press. ISBN 9781280534454.
- Annas, George J. (2010). Worst case bioethics: death, disaster, and public health. New York, New York: Oxford University Press. ISBN 9780195391732.
- Annas, George J. (2014). Public Health Law (2nd ed.). University of California Press. ISBN 978-0520272454.
- Annas, George J., & Elias, Sherman (2015). *Genomic Messages: How the Evolving Science of Genetics Affects Our Health, Families, and Future*. HarperOne. ISBN 978-0-06-222825-3.

=== Journal articles ===
- Annas, George J. (Summer 1991). "Determining the fate of gestational mothers". Women's Health Issues. 1 (3): 158–160. doi:10.1016/S1049-3867(05)80124-0. PMID 1822389.
- Annas, George J.; Grodin, Michael A. (27 November 1996). "Legacies of Nuremberg: medical ethics and human rights". JAMA: The Journal of the American Medical Association. 276 (20): 1682–1683. doi:10.1001/jama.1996.03540200068035. PMID 8922458.
- Annas, George J. (2001). "Conjoined Twins — The Limits of Law at the Limits of Life." *New England Journal of Medicine*, 344(14), 1104–1108. https://doi.org/10.1056/NEJM200104053441419

=== Honors and recognition ===
- Member, National Academy of Medicine
- Fellow, American Association for the Advancement of Science
- Vice Chair, American Bar Association’s Committee on Health Rights and Bioethics
- Member, Committee on Human Rights of the National Academy of Sciences
- Held various government regulatory posts, including:
- -- Vice Chair, Massachusetts Board of Registration in Medicine
- -- Chair, Massachusetts Health Facilities Appeals Board
- -- Chair, Massachusetts Organ Transplant Task Force

=== Advocacy and impact ===
- Advocated for patient rights, including the right to refuse medical treatment
- Criticized force-feeding of detainees and medical complicity in torture
- Contributed to the field of health and human rights, particularly in response to public health crises like HIV/AIDS

== See also ==
- Bioethics
- Biopolitics
- Eugenics Wars argument
- Genism
