= Western Association of Map Libraries =

North American non-profit for map collectors

The Western Association of Map Libraries (WAML) is a not-for-profit organization dedicated to the promotion, preservation, and use of maps and geospatial information. Its purpose as stated in its by-laws is:

"to encourage high standards in every phase of the organization and administration of map libraries by:

- Providing a forum to discuss mutual concerns and interests;
- Exchanging information on experiences, ideas and methods;
- Encouraging higher production standards of map manufacturers.
- Establishing and improving standards of professional service in this field."

Founded in 1967, WAML was the first independent organization centered on map collections and the librarians who oversee them. Academic libraries have always been strongly represented in the membership, but members also hail from public libraries, private collections, and government and commercial entities, or have been simply aficionados of maps and cartographic information. While paper map collections were traditionally the focus of attention, the advent of geographic information systems (GIS) and other digital platforms for geospatial data have led to a change in emphasis. Presentations at WAML's meetings range from cartographic history and innovative uses of historical maps and aerial photography to developments in digital cartography and issues of GIS use in a library setting. WAML has always had a practical bent, providing its members with networking opportunities and continuing education for their work in or with cartographic collections and geospatial data. As a result, it has attracted members from far beyond its principle region of the Western United States and Canada.

== History ==
The Western Association of Map Libraries had its beginnings with a meeting held in November 1966 at the Map Room of the main library on the campus of the University of California, Berkeley. Map librarians Sheila Dowd of Berkeley, Carlos Hagen of UCLA, and Ed Thatcher of the University of Oregon had issued an invitation to colleagues at institutions in several states. Discussion involved the need for an organization focused on map libraries, the geographical scope, and whether to affiliate with other organizations with a geographic orientation, such as the Geoscience Information Society (GSIS) or the Geography and Map Division of the Special Libraries Association. Concluding that such affiliation would not meet their needs, the Berkeley meeting attendees appointed an interim Executive Committee to "develop recommendations concerning affiliation, possible projects to be undertaken, and plans for the next meeting." That meeting occurred on July 1, 1967, at the library of San Francisco State University, at which the fifteen attendees formally established the Western Association of Map Librarians. (The last word was changed to "Libraries" in March 1969.) Stan Stevens, Map Librarian at the University of California, Santa Cruz, was elected president, and he presented his draft of a Constitution for the organization, which was adopted unanimously. A set of By-laws was approved by the membership in 1973. The text of the Constitution and By-Laws have been amended several times in the decades since. The 1969 by-laws included a definition of the association's "principal region": "The following Provinces of Canada and States of the United States shall comprise the Principal Region for membership purposes: Alberta, British Columbia, Alaska, Arizona, California, Colorado, Hawaii, Idaho, Montana, Nevada, Oregon, Utah, Washington, Wyoming." Meetings would always be held within the principal region, unless the membership voted to hold a meeting outside of it. This occurred for the first time in September 1998, when WAML met at the Library of Congress in Washington, D.C.

== Activities and projects ==
WAML's activities and projects have included:

- Regular meetings of the membership. A tradition developed of meeting in both the Spring and Fall of each year, with individual members volunteering to organize and host each meeting. WAML managed to keep to this schedule until recently, when the expense of travelling to meetings rose and the amount of travel funds from members' institutions was decreasing.
- Directory of Map Collections. Compiled under the direction of Mary Schell, Head of government publications at the California State Library, it listed 111 collections in the Pacific Coast area. It was published in 1969 by the California State Library's Government Publications Section as GPS Publication no. 4.
- Publishing the WAML Information Bulletin. Launched in 1969 by Robert Sivers during his term as president, the "IB" has contained organizational business, lists and reviews of new publications, and articles on the history of cartography and practical aspects of map librarianship and map collections.
- Occasional publications. WAML has published several publications useful for library reference, including major "cartobibliographies" that inform the user of what maps have been published for a certain region or by a given government agency. These include:
  - Union List of Sanborn Fire Insurance Maps Held by Institutions in the United States and Canada, v.1: Alabama to Missouri, by R. Philip Hoehn (Occasional Paper no. 1, published in 1976)
  - Union List of Sanborn Fire Insurance maps held by Institutions in the United States and Canada, v.2: Montana to Wyoming; Canada and Mexico, by William S. Peterson-Hunt and Evelyn L. Woodruff; with a Supplement and Corrigenda to Volume 1, by R. Philip Hoehn (OP 3, 1977)
  - Map Index to Topographic Quadrangles of the United States, 1882-1940, by Riley Moore Moffat (OP 10, 1986)
  - Cartobibliography of Separately Published U.S. Geological Survey Special Maps and River Surveys, by Peter L. Stark (OP 12, 1990)
- Cartographic Users Advisory Council. WAML was a founding member of this group, whose aim was to advocate for the availability of and access to cartographic products and information from federal agencies and to create "a forum for exchange of ideas and information between the cartographic information community and the agencies disseminating cartographic products.
- Map Librarian's toolbox: a set of web pages on WAML's website bringing together various resources related to map librarianship.
- Scanning Projects Clearinghouse. This project sought to create a "union list" of map digitization projects among libraries in the principal region, so as to increase knowledge and accessibility to these projects and reduce duplication of effort.

== See also ==
- List of libraries in the United States
- Lists of libraries
