= Global health law =

Field of law

Global health law (Note: Sometimes called international health law, although this term is also applied more narrowly to nation-state relations specifically and their relationship to public health.) is the field of health law dealing with global health. The field began as an outgrowth of public health law, applying it to the international dimensions of health. According to scholars from the Georgetown University Law Center in the United States, global health law "encompasses the legal norms, processes, and institutions needed to create the conditions for people throughout the world to attain the highest possible level of physical and mental health". Among the most influential scholars in the field are Lawrence Gostin and Allyn Taylor.

Although public health was among the first fields in which an intergovernmental organization was established, public health law remained of little concern to international law through most of the 20th century. Globalization is understood to have contributed to the expansion of global health law. The scope of the field now includes "the impact of globalization on public health diplomacy; the growth of global concern with economic and social rights, including the right to health; and expanding appreciation of the nexus between global health law and other realms of international legal concern". It also "encompasses international law and policy that directly or indirectly affects global health, including treaties, regulations, global strategies, and expert guidelines".

International health law, a traditional approach to global health law, developed in the mid–19th century to control infectious diseases, rooted in the approach that relations between nation-states underpinned worldwide public health collaboration. Global health law, in its modern incarnation, includes individuals and nongovernmental organizations in the study of public health.

Although the two fields are related, global health law distinguishes itself also from public health law by its focus on the relationship between international law and health, rather than the legal powers of the state. The creation of non-state actors has changed the traditional forms of collaboration, leading to the rise of global health law as a discipline considering greater types of actors; the World Health Organization (WHO; created in 1948) is one such example of a non-state establishment advancing public health internationally, though the existence of divided powers has fragmented global health progress. The application of global health law was transformed during the COVID-19 pandemic, when the WHO negotiated the International Health Regulations and Pandemic Agreement, hailed as examples of legal instruments framing global health. During the pandemic, global health law remained fragmented, with the proposed changes presented as ways to unify global health under a binding legal framework. In 2024 and 2025, these legal frameworks were adopted by the World Health Assembly in moves that were considered steps toward greater pandemic preparedness.
