= Women's Health Issues (journal) =

- Discipline: Women's health
- Language: English
- Edited by: Chloe E. Bird

Publication details
- History: 1990–present
- Publisher: Elsevier on behalf of the Jacobs Institute of Women's Health (United States)
- Frequency: Bimonthly
- Impact factor: 1.811 (2015)

Standard abbreviations
- ISO 4: Women's Health Issues

Indexing
- CODEN: WHISEH
- ISSN: 1049-3867 (print); 1878-4321 (web)
- LCCN: 91656026
- OCLC no.: 222770672

Links
- Journal homepage; Online archive; Journal page at publisher's website

Women's Health Issues is a bimonthly peer-reviewed medical journal covering women's health care and policy. It is the official journal of the Jacobs Institute of Women's Health and published on their behalf by Elsevier. The editor-in-chief is Chloe E. Bird (RAND Corporation).

== Abstracting and indexing ==
The journal is abstracted and indexed in:

- Cumulative Index to Nursing and Allied Health Literature
- Current Contents
- MEDLINE
- Embase
- Sociological Abstracts
- Studies on Women Abstracts
- Scopus

According to the Journal Citation Reports, the journal has a 2015 impact factor of 1.811, ranking it 4th out of 40 journals in the category "Women's Studies".

== See also ==
- List of medical journals
- List of women's studies journals
