= World Association for Medical Law =

The World Association for Medical Law (WAML) was formally established in 1967. It is a not-for profit organization, and according to its statutes, its purpose is to encourage the study and discussion of problems concerning medical law, forensic and legal medicine and ethics, and their possible solution in ways that are beneficial to humanity and advancement of human rights. The aim of the WAML is to promote the study of the consequences in jurisprudence, legislation and ethics of developments in medicine, health care and related sciences.

== Medical Law ==
Medical Law concerns the rights and duties of the health professions and is thus directly linked to professional liability and the field of Bioethics.

This growing field of academic research is also of very practical nature, as it pertains to real every-day situations in the hospital, in a clinical trial, and in many other health related settings.

The development of the field of medical law led to the establishment of Courses on medical law in various law schools, dentistry schools, medical schools, nursing schools etc. Also, some universities now offer LLM and even JSD or PhD specialising in health law and medical law.

At same time, many countries have local organizations and associations of medical law

== Structure ==
The Board of Governors (BoG) is a body of representatives from various countries. Each member of the BoG represents a different country and is elected at the General Assembly held during each World Congress.

The Council of Presidents (CoP) brings together leaders of national, regional and international organisations to exchange ideas and discuss issues that may prevail in a particular part of the world and for which others may be able to offer solution.

The Executive Committee (EC) is leading the association with the President, Vice president, Secretary General and Treasurer

== World Congresses ==
Since its creation the WAML held 29 World Congresses for Medical Law, in various countries in the world.

== Medicine and Law ==
The journal (in-chief editor:Prof. Roy Beran) has been published for over 45 years. It has been pronounced by the Kennedy Institute of Ethics as a "priority journal".
