= Public health law =

Law relating to public health

Public health law examines the authority of the government at various jurisdictional levels to improve public health, the health of the general population within societal limits and norms. Public health law focuses on the duties of the government to achieve these goals, limits on that power, and the population perspective.

Additionally, public health law focuses on legal issues in public health practice and on the public health effects of legal practice.

While the field of public health law focuses on the powers of the state, global health law, a more international discipline, includes a broader range of actors and transnational institutions.

== Police power ==
Police power can be defined as the inherent power of a government to exercise reasonable control over persons and property within its jurisdiction in the interest of the general security, health, safety, morals, and welfare except where legally prohibited. These areas perpetuate are employed by governmental agencies. Bioterrorism is a growing focus of this practice area in some jurisdictions; for example, public health lawyers in the United States have worked in the creation of the Model State Emergency Health Powers Act and the Model State Public Health Act.

== Disease and injury prevention ==
This broader area of public health law applies legal tools to public health problems associated with disease and injury. Practitioners apply legislation, regulation, litigation (private enforcement), and international law to public health problems using the law as an instrument of public health. Litigation against tobacco companies in the United States provides an excellent example.

== Public health and individual rights ==
Some research suggests a tension in public health law regarding institutions' duties to protect public health and their duties to protect individual freedom: the best predictor of support for common public health recommendations such as hand-washing, mask-wearing, and staying at home (to avoid the spread of disease) were people's beliefs that we should prevent great harm when doing so doesn't cause greater harm, but the best predictor of flouting these public health recommendation was people's preferences for liberty over equality. This suggests that public health policymakers may face a dilemma between being perceived as not protecting public health or as not protecting individual liberty. So securing support for public health laws will require a careful appeal to each of these seemingly competing concerns.

== See also ==
- Health law
- Public Health Act 1875
- Title 42 of the Code of Federal Regulations
- WHO Framework Convention on Tobacco Control
