= Medical law =

Area of law dealing with the practice of medicine

Medical law is the branch of law which concerns the prerogatives and responsibilities of medical professionals and the rights of the patient. It should not be confused with medical jurisprudence, which is a branch of medicine, rather than a branch of law.

== Branches ==
Branches of medical law include:

- the law of torts (i.e. medical malpractice);
- criminal law in relation to medical practice and treatment;
- the ethics of medical practice;
- health law and regulation.

== Administrative law ==
A Health professional's fitness to practise is regulated by medical licensing. If concerns are raised regarding a health professional the licensing body may choose to suspend or reject their license.

== Education to work in medical law ==
A career in Medical Law usually requires a bachelor's degree in bioethics, government, healthcare management or policy, public or global health, or (outside the US) law.

== Career descriptions in the field of medical law ==
- Reviewing medical documents, files, and receipts in connection with a medical lawsuit.
- Medical lawyers advise legal clients on their rights during trial.
- May keep evidence intact and preserved for trial (such as defective medicines or medical equipment).
- May interpret medical laws, standards, and guidelines in the area (they can often vary by region and by medical practice).
- Medical lawyers typically assist victims in obtaining a damages award to compensate them for their losses and injuries.
- Medical lawyers often represent clients in the healthcare industry in connection with general corporate matters, including corporate reorganization, capital financing, employee benefits, tax, and antitrust issues and general contract negotiation. They often provide advice regarding physician recruitment, acquisition of physician practices, and medical staff relations matters. Medical lawyers also provide guidance on telemedicine and health reform issues.

== See also ==
- Abortion law
- Assault (tort) and Battery (tort), a form of trespass to the person
- Bioethics
- Competence (law)
- Compulsory sterilization
- Conjoined twins
- Consent (criminal law)
- The Convention on Human Rights and Biomedicine
- Euthanasia
- Freedom of information
- Health law, the body of healthcare legislation and government regulation
- Inviolability
- Involuntary commitment
- Involuntary treatment
- Medical ethics
- Medical malpractice
- Medical record
- Privacy law
- Quality of life (healthcare)
- Reproductive rights
- Reproductive technology
- World Association for Medical Law

== Notable cases ==
- Sorrell v. IMS Health Inc.
- Airedale NHS Trust v Bland [1993] 1 All ER 821 HL http://www.bailii.org/uk/cases/UKHL/1992/5.html
- Montgomery v Lanarkshire Health Board [2015] UKSC 11 https://web.archive.org/web/20180512202252/https://www.supremecourt.uk/decided-cases/docs/UKSC_2013_0136_Judgment.pdf
