= Health law =

Field of law

Health law is a field of law that encompasses federal, state, and local law, rules, regulations and other jurisprudence among providers, payers and vendors to the health care industry and its patients, and delivery of health care services, with an emphasis on operations, regulatory and transactional issues.

== Terminology ==
The Florida Bar defines "health law" as "legal issues involving federal, state, or local law, rules or regulations and health care provider issues, regulation of providers, legal issues regarding relationships between and among providers, legal issues regarding relationships between providers and payers, and legal issues regarding the delivery of health care services." American University's college of law, in health law and policy, divides health law into 4 areas: health care law (focused on treatment), public and population health law (focused on prevention), bioethics, and global health law.

The terms "legislation" and "law" are used to refer generically to statutes, regulation and other legal instruments (e.g. ministerial decrees) that may be the forms of law used in a particular country.

In general, there are a wide range of regulatory strategies that may be used to ensure people's health and safety. Increasingly, regulators are taking an approach of "responsive regulation". This involves using mechanisms that are responsive to the context, conduct, and culture of those being regulated, providing for a range of regulatory mechanisms to achieve the behavior desired. Where appropriate, the aim is to use incentives before sanctions. However, when those being regulated do not respond accordingly, escalating sanctions can be invoked. These strategies may be broadly classified into five groups:

1. voluntarism: voluntary compliance undertaken by an individual organization without any coercion;
2. self-regulation: for example, an unorganized group that regulates the behavior of its members through a voluntary code of practice;
3. economic instruments: for example, supply funding sanctions or incentives for health care providers, and/or demand-side measures that give more power to consumers;
4. meta-regulation: involving an external regulatory body to ensure that health care providers implement safety and quality practices and programs;
5. command and control mechanisms: involving enforcement by government

== Legal practice ==
Areas of law that may fall under the umbrella of health law include:

- Contract law
- Medical malpractice
- Medical law
- Administrative law
- Public health law
- Consent

In the United States, medicine and the law are interconnected. The law intervenes to regulate the duty to treat, which essentially is ruled by contract law. Doctors have the right to refuse treatment, in the absence of an emergency, when no previous doctor-patient relationship existed. However, according to EMTALA, doctors cannot discriminate because of disability, abandon a patient, or refuse their services in an emergency.

=== Board certification ===
Health law was first adopted as a separate legal specialty by The Florida Bar's Board of Legal Specialization in 1995. Attorneys could become board-certified in health law and could hold themselves out as a "legal specialist" or "legal expert." In 2002, Texas adopted a similar program.

=== Education ===
Attorneys may obtain additional education in the practice of health law via postgraduate Master of Laws (LL.M.) programs available in some law schools. The LL.M. demonstrates a higher level of course work and study than the basic law degree (J.D. or B.S.L.). Some law schools with graduate law programs offer a general LL.M. with course emphasis on health law, global health law, public health law, forensic medicine, or similar studies.

=== Malpractice ===
Medical malpractice is also an area where law and medicine are interconnected, which relates to the standard of care, where custom similar locality rule may apply. There may be different schools of thought, where reputability is the issue at hand and alternative theories that can be based on the hand formula.

There are other aspects of importance within the area of medical malpractice, such as causation, where medical probability and loss of chance are present. Damages, where the value of life and tort reforms appear to differ, and affirmative defenses, within the doctrine of informed consent, where waivers cannot suffice. There are rules such as the discovery rule that states that the statute of limitations starts to run when the injury has been discovered and not when it took place.

== See also ==
- Bioethics
- Global health law
- Health policy
- Health promotion
- Health system
- Medical Law
- Drug policy
- Public health
- Regulation of therapeutic goods
- World Association for Medical Law
- Universal health care
