= Sofia Gruskin =

American health and human rights scholar

Sofia Gruskin is a scholar and advocate in the field of health and human rights whose contributions range from global policy to the grassroots level. For more than 25 years her work has been instrumental in developing the conceptual, methodological, and empirical links between health and human rights, with a focus on sexual and reproductive health, HIV and AIDS, child and adolescent health, gender-based violence, non-communicable disease, and health systems. Currently, Gruskin is a professor at the Keck School of Medicine and Gould School of Law at the University of Southern California. Gruskin also directs the USC Institute for Global Health as well as its Program on Global Health & Human Rights and leads the USC Law & Global Health Collaboration with fellow professors.

Gruskin is the co-coordinator of the Rights Oriented Research and Education (RORE) Network in Sexual and Reproductive health, which is an international network of sexual and reproductive health and rights researchers and advocates, as well as a member of the PEPFAR Scientific Advisory Board. She has served on many boards and committees for the World Health Organization, the Office of the High Commissioner for Human Rights, and other major players in global health.

== Early life and education ==
Gruskin's focus on public health, human rights, and law emerged during the early years of the global AIDS crisis. Gruskin observed that around the world a broad range of rights were being restricted in the name of public health but without proper justification, resulting in widespread violations of rights with devastating health effects.

Gruskin received her bachelor's degree in sociology, specializing in Ethnomethodology, from the University of California, Santa Cruz. In 1990, she completed a doctoral degree in jurisprudence at the Cardozo School of Law. Also in 1990, Gruskin participated in an internship at the United States Department of State in the Office of the Legal Advisor. In 1991, Gruskin was admitted to the New York State Bar. In 1993, Gruskin completed a master's degree in International Affairs, specializing in Public Health and Human Rights at Columbia University's School of International and Public Affairs.

== Career ==
Soon after graduate school, Sofia Gruskin came to work with Dr. Jonathan Mann. In association with Dr. Daniel Tarantola, they worked to establish the François-Xavier Bagnoud Center for Health and Human Rights at Harvard University. Gruskin was head of the Harvard School of Public Health's program on International Health and Human Rights, chair of the Group on Reproductive Health and Rights at the Harvard Center for Population and Development Studies, associate professor in the Department of Global Health and Population, and Co-Director of the Inter-departmental Program on Women, Gender and Health. She was at Harvard between 1993 and 2010, and from 2010-2015 was an adjunct professor in Global Health at Harvard University's T.H. Chan School of Public Health.

Gruskin was a member of the Amnesty International board of directors from 2002 to 2006; the principal architect of the 2003 General Comment on HIV/AIDS promulgated by the UN Committee on the Rights of the Child; a standing member of the Scientific Review Committee on Behavioral and Social Consequences of HIV/AIDS for the National Institutes of Health from 2005 to 2009; chair of the UNAIDS Reference Group on HIV and Human Rights from 2002-2006; a member of the Institute of Medicine's Committee for the Outcome and Impact Evaluation of Global HIV/AIDS Programs Implemented Under the Lantos/Hyde Act of 2008 (PEPFAR, 2010-2013); a member of the Technical Advisory Group of the UN Global Commission on HIV and the Law from 2010 to 2012; and a member of the Guttmacher Institute's Board of Directors from 2014-2016.

Gruskin now holds professorial roles in Preventive Medicine at the Keck School of Medicine and at the Gould School of Law at the University of Southern California and previously in the Department of Global Health and Population at the T. H. Chan School of Public Health. In addition to teaching full term courses, Gruskin has also been invited as a guest lecturer in a variety of full-term academic classes. Over the course of her career, Gruskin has partnered with the World Health Organization (WHO), the United Nations Development Program (UNDP), United Nations Population Fund (UNFPA), IPAS, Open Society Foundation, and local organizations and universities in Brazil, India, and Vietnam, amongst others.

== Contribution ==
Sofia Gruskin has been a singular figure continuously at the cutting edge of conceptual and programming advances. Gruskin said, "We have to recognize that law impacts health and we need to know when law is harming people's lives and when it needs to change." She is known for addressing important questions such as, "What should be done to be sure you can access what you need, when you need it, no matter where you are or who you are? How do we best ensure health systems are supportive of the health and human rights of all populations?" Gruskin's distinct contribution has been in influencing the direction of public health research and action by defining key concepts, developing and testing conceptual and analytical frameworks, and creating policy and programming tools. Her efforts have been to define, operationalize, and test what is meant by a "rights-based" approach to health; produce scholarly works to define the conceptual differences between human rights and other frameworks concerned with justice, including ethics and equity; to make clear the distinct contributions human rights offers to health practice including the use of indicators to determine the contribution of human rights to public health effort globally.

=== Books and editorial works ===
- Gruskin S. (1996). An International Perspective on AIDS-Related Violations of Human Rights. New York: American Foundation for AIDS Research.
- Mann J., Gruskin S. and Bertrand D. (1997). Santé Publique et Droits de l'Homme. Paris: Collection Espace Ethique.
- Mann J., Gruskin S. et al. (ed.) (1999). Health and Human Rights: A Reader. Routledge, New York.
- Gruskin S. et al. (ed.) (2005). Perspectives in Health and Human Rights. Routledge, Taylor and Francis.
- Gruskin S. (ed.). (2012). Pregnancy Decisions of HIV-Positive Women. Reproductive Health Matters, vol 20(30) supp. p1-140.
- Grodin M. et al. (ed.) (2013). Health and Human Rights in a Changing World. Routledge, Taylor and Francis, textbook.
- Gruskin (ed) (2014). Reproductive, Maternal, Newborn and Child Health and Human Rights, a Toolbox for Examining Laws, Regulations and Policies. Geneva: Department of Reproductive Health and Research, World Health Organization.

=== Articles ===
Gruskin is an associate editor at The American Journal of Public Health, Global Public Health, Reproductive Health Matters, and Revue Tiers Monde.

Selected articles include:

- Mann J. et al. (1994). Health and Human Rights Health and Human Rights, vol 1(1).
- Braveman P. and Gruskin S. (2003) Defining Equity in Health Journal of Epidemiology and Community Health, vol 57(4):254-258.
- Gruskin S. et al. (2007). History, Principles and Practice of Health and Human Rights The Lancet, vol 370:449-455.
- Gruskin S and Daniels N. (2008). Justice and Human Rights: Priority Setting and Fair Deliberative Process. American Journal of Public Health, vol 98(9):1573-1577.
- Gruskin S. and Ferguson L. (2009). Using Indicators to Determine the Contribution of Human Rights to Public Health Efforts: Why? What? And How? Bulletin of the World Health Organization, vol 87(9):714-719.
- Cottingham, J., Kismödi, E., Martin Hilber, A., Lincetto, O., Stahlhofer, M., Gruskin, S. (2010). Using human rights for sexual and reproductive health: improving legal and regulatory frameworks. Geneva: World Health Organization, vol. 88.
- Gruskin S. and Raad Z. (2010). Are Drug Companies Living Up to Their Human Rights Responsibilities? Moving Toward Assessment PLOS Medicine, vol 7(9).
- Gruskin S. et al. (2010). Rights-Based Approaches to Health Policies and Programmes: Articulations, Ambiguities and Assessment. Journal of Public Health Policy, vol 31(2) p129-145.
- Gruskin S. et al. (2013). Identifying Structural Barriers to an Effective HIV Response: Using 2010 NCPI Data to Evaluate the Human Rights, Legal and Policy Environment Journal of the International AIDS Society, vol 16.
- Gruskin, S., Ravindran T. K. S. (2014). Realising the ICPD 20 years later: Shifting the paradigms for research and education. Global Public Health, 9(6), p. 647-652.
- Miller, A. M., Kismödi, E., Cottingham, J., Gruskin, S. (2015). Sexual rights as human rights: a guide to authoritative sources and principles for applying human rights to sexuality and sexual health. London: Reproductive Health Matters, 23(46), p. 16-30.
- Miller, A. M., Gruskin, S., Cottingham, J., Kismödi, E. (2015). Sound and Fury ‒ engaging with the politics and the law of sexual rights. London: Reproductive Health Matters, 23(46), p. 7-15.
