= Emma Cave =

British legal scholar

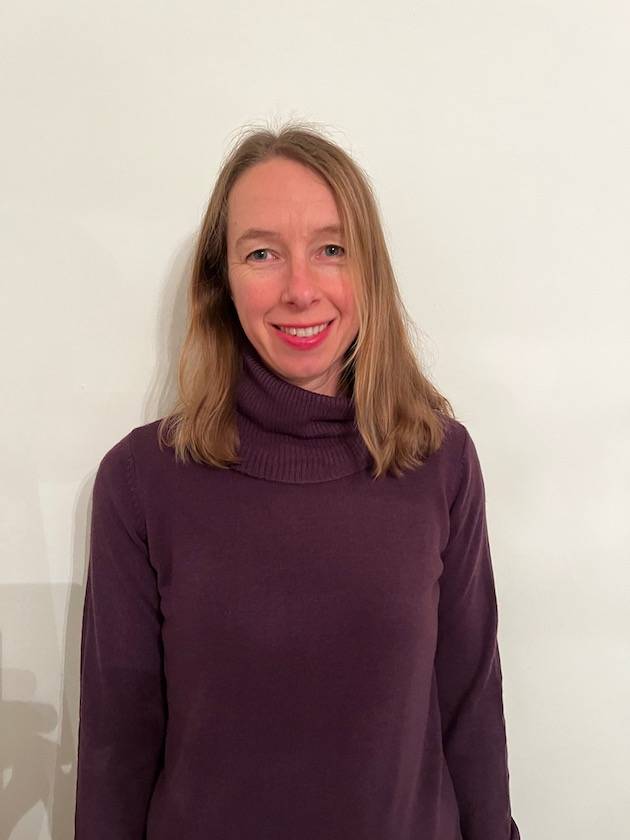
- Born: Emma Gail Gillian Pickworth; 1974 (age 51–52)

Academic background
- Education: Lady Manners School
- Alma mater: Newcastle University

Academic work
- Discipline: Law
- Sub-discipline: Medical law Medical ethics
- Notable works: Medicine, Patients and the Law
- Website: https://www.durham.ac.uk/staff/emma-cave/

Emma Cave (born 1974) is a British legal scholar who specialises in health law and the regulation of emerging technologies. She is Professor of Healthcare Law at Durham Law School, Durham University, and Director of Durham CELLS (Centre for Ethics and Law in the Life Sciences), where she works on the intersection of law, bioethics and health.

== Early life and education ==
Born Emma Pickworth, she attended Lady Manners School, a state secondary school in Bakewell. She went on to complete an LLB, M.Jur and PhD.

== Career ==
Cave took up a research fellowship at the Centre for Professional Ethics, UCLan in 1998, continuing her PhD part time. She moved to the University of Manchester in 2001 and was given a lectureship at the University of Leeds in 2001. She was promoted to Senior Lecturer in 2008, took up a readership at Durham University in 2013 and became a professor of law in 2016.

== Advisory roles ==
Cave has provided expert advice to the UK government, public inquiries, independent policy & research centres and medical professional bodies.

On emerging biotechnologies she chaired a Nuffield Council on Bioethics working group on Stem Cell-Based Embryo Models in 2024, reporting on the scientific and ethical issues the new technology raises and setting out governance proposals. She was subsequently appointed to the Nuffield Council on Bioethics working group reviewing the 14-Day Rule for Embryo Culture in 2025. She previously served as a member of the Human Fertilisation and Embryology Authority, where she was Deputy Chair of the Statutory Approvals Committee.

Cave has also advised on matters relating to health ethics and law, chairing the General Medical Council Good Medical Practice Advisory Forum, resulting in new Good Medical Practice guidance in 2024. She joined the Medical Ethics Committee of the British Medical Association in 2024. She was a core member of the Independent Health and Social Care Select Committee Expert Panel from 2022 and a member of the Cass Review Assurance Group 2021-23. In 2018, she was awarded a part time Scottish Parliament Academic Fellowship.

On public inquiries, Cave was a member of the UK COVID-19 Inquiry ethics advisory group to advise on their 'Every Story Matters' research. And with Professor Bobbie Farsides, she co-convened the Medical Ethics expert group to the UK Infected Blood Inquiry, producing a report and giving evidence to the Inquiry.

Media interviews in print, radio and television include the BBC, CNN, Lancet, FullFact and ITV's Exposure.

== Publications ==
With Margaret Brazier, Cave has co-authored Medicine, Patients and the Law, since the 4th edition. Brazier and Cave were joined by Rob Heywood for the 7th edition in 2023.

Cave's research bridges scientific developments and clinical applications across the life span. On embryo research her research she has set out proposals for the regulation of emerging biotechnologies. Her comparative monograph The Mother of All Crimes considers the moral status of the fetus and how this translates into criminal law.

In relation to the treatment of young children, she has (with David Archard and Joe Brierley) argued in favour of the best interests test and against arguments for a new threshold of significant harm that would give parents extended decision-making powers.

Cave has published extensively on consent of children and adolescents, identifying problems with the legal concept of child competence (Gillick competence) and suggesting solutions to them. She has also engaged with the complexities of treating adolescents with eating disorders.

On informed consent of adults, she argued for the importance of protecting patient autonomy by limiting the role of the therapeutic privilege but also for an approach that recognises and upholds the role of clinicians in supporting patients and working with them in partnership.

Cave also has a strong interest in supporting ethical medical decision making. Her research considers the role and remit of research and clinical ethics committees. During the COVID-19 pandemic she published advice on super-spreaders vaccine choice, clinical standards and clinical ethics support.
