= Durham Law School =

Law school in Durham, England

Coordinates: 54°46′07″N 1°34′13″W

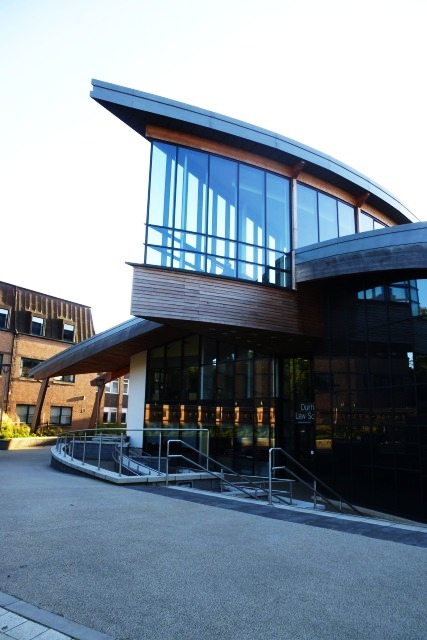
- Entrance to Durham Law School
- Type: Law school
- Established: 1964
- Parent institution: Durham University
- Dean: Volker Roeben
- Location: Durham University; Palatine Centre; Stockton Road; Durham; DH1 3LE, Durham, UK
- Website: www.durham.ac.uk/law/

Durham Law School is the law school of Durham University in Durham, England. It has research centres in biolaw and medical law, Chinese law, commercial and corporate law, criminal law, European law, human rights and public law, international law, and sustainable development.

== History ==
Law degrees have been awarded at Durham University since the university's inception in the 1830s, mainly to graduates working in law, and there was a reader in law from 1833 to 1872 who gave occasional lectures on the subject. Regular law lectures began in 1907 at Armstrong College in Newcastle (now Newcastle University) and the first formal law school was established there in 1923, becoming a faculty in 1938. After Newcastle became independent of Durham in 1963, the current school was established on 1 October 1964, with the first students in law in Durham graduating in 1969. This became a faculty in 1970 until reverting to a department in 1985. It was congratulated on its 50th anniversary in a House of Commons early day motion in 2018.

== Location ==
Durham Law School is housed in the BREEAM excellent-rated Palatine Centre, on Durham University's Lower Mountjoy site. This was named as the most impressive law school building in the world by Best Choice Schools in 2014. The building includes a moot court and the 90-seat Harvard-style Hogan Lovells lecture theatre.

== Academic profile ==
=== Programmes ===
Undergraduate teaching is delivered through lectures, seminars and small group tutorials. Extra-curricula opportunities include mooting and pro bono legal work.

Durham Law School offers a three-year LLB degree and a four-year LLB with Year Abroad degree. They are both Qualifying Law Degree programmes for the purpose of practicing as a barrister or solicitor in England and Wales. The course includes modules on Chinese law, launched in response to the needs of City firms. The law school also runs a Chinese law summer school – the first in the UK and first in English outside Asia – in a move described by the Times as offering "great career prospects" for Durham Law School graduates beyond what is offered at other UK law schools.

Taught postgraduate LLM degree programmes include a general Master of Laws LLM, LLM in Corporate Law, LLM in European Trade and Commercial Law, LLM in International Trade and Commercial Law, LLM in International Law and Governance, LLM in International Environmental Law, and LLM in Medical Law and Ethics.

Research postgraduate degree programmes include a one-year Master of Jurisprudence MJur and PhD in Law.

=== Reputation and rankings ===
Rankings
National rankings
- Complete (2027): 5
- Guardian (2027): 5
- Times / Sunday Times (2027): 4

Global rankings
- ARWU (2026): 151-200
- QS (2027): 49
- THE (2026): 55

For 2026, Durham Law School was ranked third in the UK by the Complete University Guide, behind only Cambridge and UCL, fourth by the Guardian University Guide, and joint fourth by the Times Good University Guide. Internationally, Durham Law School was ranked 55th in the world for law in the 2025 Times Higher Education ranking, 49th in the world for law by the 2026 QS ranking. and in the 151–200 range by the Academic Ranking of World Universities.

In 2015, the Chambers Student triennial survey of which universities law firm trainees had attended ranked Durham third behind Oxford and Cambridge, supplying 7.6 per cent of law trainees in the UK (up from 4th in 2012). The survey also placed Durham second in supplying national firms (up from 11th in 2012) and third in supplying US firms in London (up from 5th in 2012).

=== Research ===
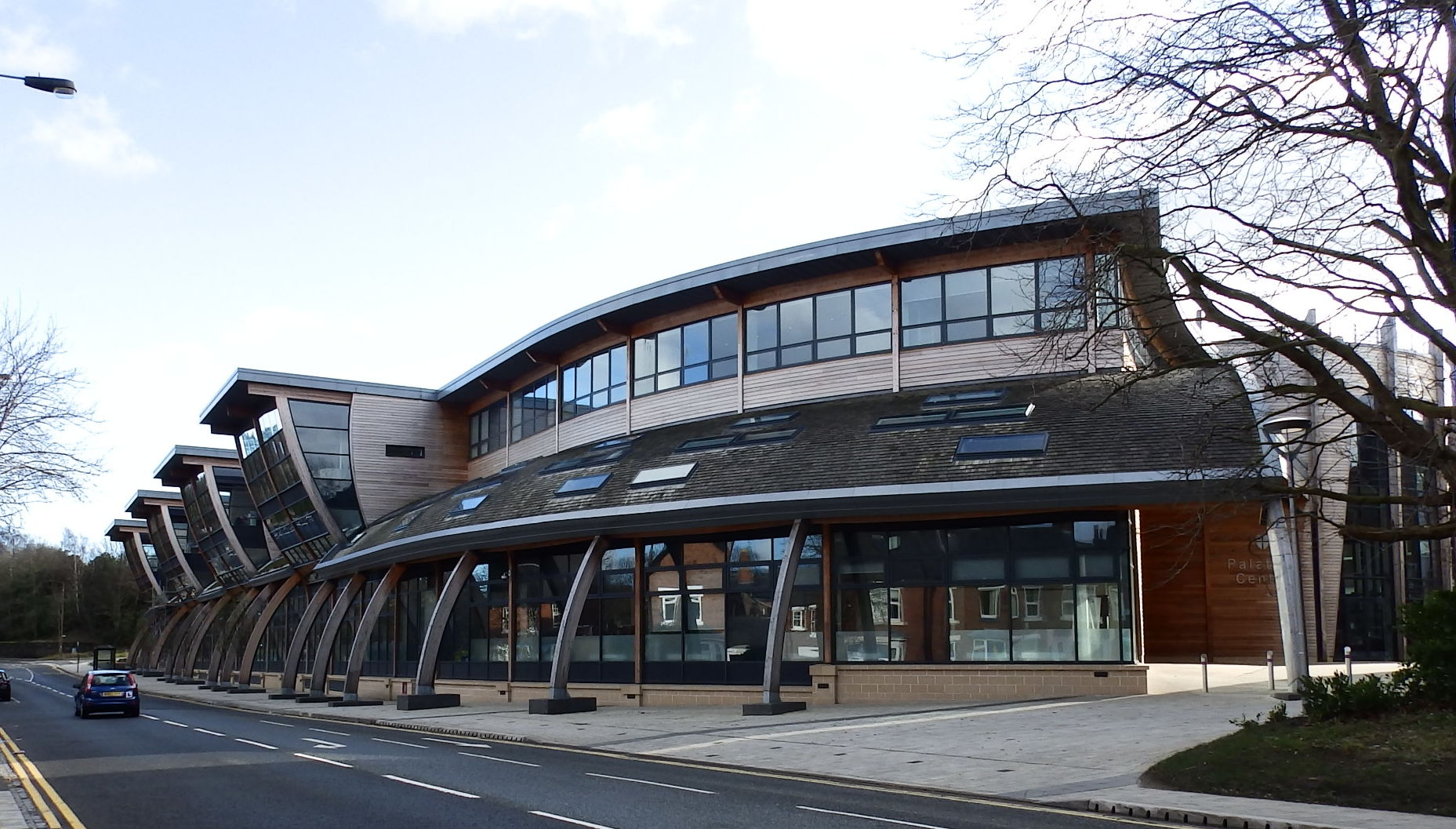
The Palatine Centre, home to Durham Law School

==== Engagement with public policy ====
Emma Cave chaired a Nuffield Council on Bioethics working group on Stem Cell-Based Embryo Models in 2024, setting out governance proposals. She also chaired the General Medical Council Good Medical Practice Advisory Forum, resulting in new good medical practice guidance in 2024.

Clare McGlynn has partnered with Glamour magazine, the End Violence Against Women Coalition and Not Your Porn to campaign for legislation against image-based abuse. This led to the creation of deepfake pornography being criminalised under the Data (Use and Access) Act 2025.

Thom Brooks wrote the report The Life in the United Kingdom Citizenship Test: Is It Unfit for Purpose? in 2013. His recommendations were subsequently backed by the House of Lords Select Committee on Citizenship and Civic Participation, the House of Lords Liaison Committee and the House of Lords Justice and Home Affairs Committee.

Tufyal Choudhury was director of research for the Independent Commission on UK Counter-Terrorism Law, Policy and Practice, which reported in 2025.

==== Research centres and groups ====
Durham Law School supports a range of research institutes, centres and groups. As of 2025, these include: the centre for Chinese law and policy, the centre for criminal law and criminal justice, the centre for ethics and law in the life sciences, the centre for sustainable development law and policy, the Durham centre for Indian law and policy, the Durham centre for law and philosophy, the Durham European law institute, the Durham international dispute resolution institute, the human rights and public law centre, the institute of commercial and corporate law, and law and global justice at Durham.

Durham's centre for Chinese law and policy was among the largest in Europe as of 2019.

The Durham centre for ethics and law in the life sciences (Durham CELLS) is a cross-departmental research centre based in the law school with members from anthropology, biology, law, medicine, philosophy, sociology and theology. It was founded in December 2011 by Shaun Pattinson and focuses on biolaw and bioethics – the legal and ethical issues raised by biological science, medicine and regulation – where it is an established expert centre. Emma Cave is its director, and its activities include running a research blog on issues relating to the ethical, social and regulatory issues raised by the life sciences, running a blog on obstetric violence, supported by conferences and seminars, engaging school students with biomedicine and bioethics, and supporting ethics advisory committees.

== Notable people ==
=== Current academics ===
The following notable individuals are academics in Durham Law School:

- Deryck Beyleveld – former head of school
- Thom Brooks – former dean and professor of law, ethics and government
- Emma Cave - professor of healthcare law
- Clare McGlynn – professor of law
- Shaun Pattinson - professor of medical law and wthics

=== Former academics ===
The following notable individuals have been academics in Durham Law School:

- Dapo Akande - lecturer, elected judge on the International Court of Justice
- Leo Blair – lecturer of law; father of Tony Blair
- David Campbell - head of law
- Sonia Harris - senior lecturer, current High Court judge
- David O'Keeffe - head of law
- Michael N. Schmitt - professor of public international law

=== Alumni ===
==== Judiciary ====
- Lady Jill Black (Trevelyan) – second women to become a Justice of the Supreme Court of the United Kingdom; former Lady Justice of Appeal
- James Goss (University) – Justice of the High Court (Queens Bench Division)
- Lord Anthony Hughes (Van Mildert) – Justice of the Supreme Court of the United Kingdom; former Lord Justice of Appeal; Vice-President of the Criminal Division of the Court of Appeal of England and Wales
- Andrew Macrae (St John's) – Vice President of the Court of Appeal of Hong Kong
- Andrew McFarlane (Collingwood) – President of the Family Division, High Court Judge, Lord Justice of Appeal
- Finola O'Farrell (Trevelyan) – Justice of the High Court (Queens Bench Division)
- Caroline Swift (St Aidan's) – leading counsel to the Inquiry in the Shipman Inquiry and Justice of the High Court (Queens Bench Division)

==== Politics ====
- Graham Brady (St Aidan's), former Conservative MP for Altrincham and Sale West (1997–2024) and chair of the 1922 Committee (2010–2024), member of the House of Lords (2024–present)
- Phil Brickell - Labour MP for Bolton West (2024-present)
- Robert Buckland QC (Hatfield), Conservative MP for Swindon South (2010–2024) and Lord Chancellor (2019–2021)
- Mohammad Faiz Azmi, Executive Chairman of Securities Commission Malaysia
- Anna Firth - former Conservative MP for Southend West and Leigh (2022-2024)
- Nick Gibb (Hild Bede) – Conservative MP for Bognor Regis and Littlehampton (1997–2024), Minister of State for Schools (2022–2023)
- Huw Merriman – Conservative MP for Bexhill and Battle (2015–2024) and Minister of State for Rail and HS2 (2022–2024)
- Ibrahim bin Ali bin Issa al-Hassan al-Mohannadi, Minister of Justice in Qatar
- Earl Pomeroy, former Democratic Party member of US House of Representatives for North Dakota's at-large congressional district (1993–2011)
- James Wharton, Conservative MP for Stockton South (2010–2017), chair of the Office for Students 2021–2024, member of the House of Lords (2020–present)

==== Other ====
- Simi Bedford - Nigerian novelist
- Richard Calland (Hatfield) - South African political advisor and analyst
- Jonathan Jones (St Chad's) - former Procurator General, Treasury Solicitor and Head of the Government Legal Service (2014-20)
- Gabby Logan (Hild Bede) - BBC sports reporter and commentator
- Jolyon Maugham (Hatfield) - founder and director of the Good Law Project
- Michael Pedersen - Scottish poet
- Stephen Welton - chair of the Business Growth Fund and British Business Bank
