= Human shields in the Israeli–Palestinian conflict =

Accusations of using civilians and civilian infrastructure to shield military targets

Human shields in the Israeli–Palestinian conflict refers to tactics employed in the Israeli–Palestinian conflict where non-combatants are placed in the line of fire to prevent military objectives from being targeted without harming the non-combatant. The accusation of the use of human shields is a common theme in the conflict. The use of Palestinians as human shields by the Israel Defense Forces has been documented by human rights organizations. Hamas has also been accused of using human shields by Israel and its allies. In addition, international and Israeli activists have voluntarily used themselves as human shields to stop Israeli violence against Palestinians.

== Background ==
The law of armed conflict requires that warring parties distinguish between combatants and non-combatants – the former may be legitimately killed, and the latter are protected. A human shield refers to the placement of a non-combatant in the line of fire, thus preventing the legitimate military objective from being targeted without harming the non-combatant.

== Use by Israeli forces ==
The use of Palestinians as human shields by the Israeli Defense Forces has been documented by human rights organizations including Human Rights Watch, B'Tselem and Amnesty International, with some scholars in the area believing the IDF may be the only military force systematically engaging in this practice in recent decades. According to B'Tselem, IDF soldiers put Palestinian civilians in front of them or otherwise put civilians in the line of fire, and forcing Palestinians to remove suspicious objects (possible explosives). IDF soldiers also force Palestinian civilians to walk through suspected booby-trapped buildings. Israel also formerly employed the "neighbor procedure" in which Palestinian civilians were forced to attempt to persuade wanted individuals to surrender themselves to the IDF. The latter practice was defended by the Israeli defense ministry, but prohibited in 2005 by the Israeli Supreme Court, though there have been accusations of its employment even after the ruling. During the 2009 invasion of Gaza, the IDF reportedly used Palestinian families (both adult and children) as human shields. A Haaretz investigation found that Palestinians, dressed up as Israeli soldiers, are widely used by the IDF in the Gaza war as human shields to explore tunnels in the Gaza Strip.

The IDF has used civilians as human shields multiple times to discourage Palestinian combatants from attacking and to perform life-threatening tasks.

=== 1948–1967 ===
During the 1956–1957 occupation of the Gaza Strip by Israel (as part of the Suez Crisis), Israeli forces would search homes of suspected Palestinian fedayeen for weapons, caches or concealed fighters. Because these homes could have booby traps or snipers waiting for Israeli soldiers, they would use Palestinian children as human shields.

=== Second Intifada ===
Israeli officials reported that the IDF made use of the "human shield" procedure on 1,200 occasions during the Second Intifada (2000–2005). This procedure resulted in at least one instance of a Palestinian civilian being killed: a 19-year-old called Nidal Abu-Mohsen. In April 2004, a 13-year-old Palestinian boy was photographed after being tied to an Israeli armored vehicle for the stated purpose of discouraging stone-throwing by Palestinian protesters.

According to Amnesty International and Human Rights Watch, the IDF used Palestinian civilians as human shields during the 2002 Battle of Jenin. B'Tselem said that "for a long period of time following the outbreak of the Second Intifada, particularly during Operation Defensive Shield, in April 2002, the IDF systematically used Palestinian civilians as human shields, forcing them to carry out military actions which threatened their lives". Al Mezan reported the systematic use of human shields during the invasion of Beit Hanoun in 2004. Human shields were also employed by Israeli soldiers to subdue a stone-throwing protest in Hebron in 2003.

Amnesty gave the following example: on 5 April 2002, an IDF officer took a Palestinian man from his house and asked him to come with them. When the Palestinian man, whose children were around him, repeatedly refused, the IDF officer said "I would prefer not to use force". The IDF officer then grabbed the Palestinian man by the collar and forced him to walk in front of the IDF soldiers. The IDF officer crouched behind the Palestinian man and started firing. Over the course of several hours, IDF soldiers had him repeatedly stand in front of them as they fired at suspected Palestinian militants. During this time the Palestinian man asked to be released but the IDF refused. Finally during one incident the Palestinian man received a bullet on his leg and was finally released by the IDF.

In 2002 the Supreme Court of Israel issued a temporary injunction banning the practice in the wake of the death of 19-year-old Nidal Abu Mohsen, who was shot dead when he was forced by the IDF to knock on the door of his neighbor, Hamas militant Nasser Jarrar, in the West Bank village of Tubas and inform him of the Israeli army's demands that he surrender.

In 2004, a 13-year-old boy, Muhammed Badwan, was photographed tied to an Israeli police vehicle in the West Bank village of Biddu being used as a shield to deter stone-throwing protesters. Rabbi Arik Ascherman was placed under arrest after he tried to intervene.

In 2005, Israel's High Court of Justice banned the practice, with the Israeli Defense Ministry appealing the decision. While acknowledging and defending the "use of Palestinians to deliver warnings to wanted men about impending arrest operations", a practice known in Israel by the "neighbor procedure" euphemism, the IDF denied reports of "using Palestinians as human shields against attacks on IDF forces", saying it had already forbidden this practice.

In 2006, however, initial investigations by B'Tselem indicated that the IDF used civilians as human shields in Beit Hanun. Defence for Children International has also found that, of the 26 cases of Palestinian children being used by Israeli forces as human shields that it has documented since 2004, the large majority happened after the Supreme Court ban.

In February 2007, the footage was released of an incident involving Sameh Amira, a 24-year-old Palestinian, whom video showed serving as a human shield for a group of Israeli soldiers, getting inside apartments suspected to belong to Palestinian militants ahead of the soldiers. A 15-year-old cousin of Amira and an 11-year-old girl in the West Bank independently told B'Tselem in February 2007 that Israeli soldiers forced each of them in separate incidents to open the door of a neighboring apartment belonging to a suspected militant, get inside ahead of them, and open doors and windows.

The IDF launched a criminal investigation into the incident involving Amira. In April 2007, it suspended a commander after the unit he was leading was accused of using Palestinians as human shields in a West Bank operation. In April 2007, CBS News reported that, according to human rights groups, the IDF did not stop the use of human shields, but the incidence was dropping.

=== "Neighbor procedure" ===
The IDF's practice of "Neighbor procedure", used during the Second Intifada, utilized Palestinians as human shields. Under this procedure, people picked at random were forced by IDF to approach the houses of suspected militants and persuade them to surrender, a practice which arguably placed the former's lives in danger. Israeli NGO Adalah legally challenged the practice before Israel's High Court of Justice in 2002. However, the IDF persisted in using Palestinians in its 'neighbor procedure', whereby people picked at random were made to approach the houses of suspects and persuade them to surrender, a practice which arguably placed the former's lives in danger. The court ruled in October 2005 "that any use of Palestinian civilians during military actions is forbidden, including the 'prior warning procedure'". According to B'tselem, reports indicate that the practice has continued nonetheless, in military operations like Operation Cast Lead and Operation Protective Edge, and the "vast majority of these reports were never investigated, and those that did result in no further action".

=== 2008–2009 Gaza War ===
During the 2008–09 Gaza War known as Operation Cast Lead, Israeli military forces were accused of continuing to use civilians as human shields by Amnesty International and Breaking the Silence. According to testimonies published by these two groups, Israeli forces used unarmed Palestinians including children to protect military positions, walk in front of armed soldiers; go into buildings to check for booby traps or gunmen; and inspect suspicious objects for explosives. Amnesty International stated that it found cases in which "Israeli troops forced Palestinians to stay in one room of their home while turning the rest of the house into a base and sniper position, effectively using the families, both adults and children, as human shields and putting them at risk". The UN Human Rights Council also accused Israel of using human shields during the 2008–09 Gaza conflict.

The Guardian compiled three videos and testimony from civilians about alleged war crimes committed by Israeli soldiers during the 2008–09 Gaza War, including the use of Palestinian children as human shields. In the videos, three teenage brothers from the al-Attar family said that they were forced at gunpoint to kneel in front of tanks to deter Hamas fighters from firing at them and that they were used to "clear" houses for the Israeli soldiers.

An IDF soldier's testimony for Breaking the Silence told that his commander ordered that for every house raided by the IDF, they sent a "neighbor" to go in before the soldier, sometimes while the soldier placed his gun on the neighbor's shoulder; according to the soldier, "commanders said these were the instructions and we had to do it". Gazan civilians also testified of being used at gunpoint as human shields by Israeli soldiers. An Israeli military official responded to these allegations: "The IDF operated in accordance with the rules of war and did the utmost to minimize harm to civilians uninvolved in combat. The IDF's use of weapons conforms to international law." An Israeli embassy spokesperson alleged Hamas pressured the people of Gaza into making those accusations.

On 12 March 2010, the Israel Defense Forces prosecution filed indictments against two staff sergeants of the Givati Brigade for forcing a 9-year-old Palestinian boy to open a number of bags they thought might contain explosives in January 2009. The boy told he was hit by the soldiers and forced to work for them at gunpoint. The IDF said it opened the investigation after the incident was brought to its attention by the United Nations. On 3 October 2010, a conviction in this matter, accompanied by a demotion and suspended sentence, was handed down by the military court against both defendants, though neither soldier was jailed. The sentence was criticized as too lenient by Human Rights Watch and the boy's mother.

=== 2009 to the 2014 Gaza War ===
In June 2013, the United Nations Committee on the Rights of the Child accused Israeli forces of "continuous use of Palestinian children as human shields and informants", voicing with deep concern 14 such cases had been reported between January 2010 and March 2013. It says almost all accused soldiers involved in the incidents have gone unpunished.

In an interview with Breaking the Silence, a former Israeli soldier recounted that the commander of his unit employed the policy, that of forcing Palestinian civilians to enter the homes of suspected militants ahead of Israeli soldiers, despite acknowledging its ban, as the commander would rather that a Palestinian civilian be killed carrying out the duty than one of his men. He told young Palestinian boys were also used by this particular unit to carry out military duties for the Israeli army.

Defense for Children International-Palestine reported 17-year-old, Ahmad Abu Raida (also: "Reeda"), was kidnapped by Israeli soldiers, who, after beating him up and threatening him, including with sexual abuse, used him as a human shield for five days, forcing him to walk in front of them with police dogs at gunpoint, search houses and dig in places soldiers suspected there might be tunnels. The New York Times stated that his assertions could not be independently corroborated; the Israeli military confirmed that he had been detained, noting his father's affiliation with Hamas, who was a senior official in the Gaza Tourism Ministry. No material evidence of the physical violence allegedly suffered by Raida, e.g. photos, medical reports or lingering wounds resulting from repeated blows, was produced.

The Euro-Mediterranean Human Rights Monitor conducted an investigation during and following the military operation. The investigation found that, during the 2014 Gaza War, Israeli soldiers used Palestinian civilians as shield in Khuza'a. A family told the group that Israeli soldiers had killed the family's patriarch after he took a step toward them, then proceeded to place the surviving members of the family, including children, by the house's windows as the soldiers started shooting around them.

=== 2021–2023 ===
In July 2021, Israeli forces held Associated Press photographer Majdi Mohammed against his will as he was on media duty during an operation in the West Bank and Palestinian protesters threw stones at troops. Mohammed related an officer told him that he was being held to prevent further stone-throwing, at which point he told the officer that this amounted to using him as a human shield.

In May 2022, Israeli soldiers were accused of using a 16-year-old girl as a human shield during a firefight with Palestinian militants in Jenin. The girl told Defence for Children International in an interview that Israeli soldiers forced her to stand in front of an Israeli military vehicle for two hours. When Amira Hass from the Ha'aretz contacted Israeli police regarding this incident, they declined to commenton specifics, stating only that the force had behaved "ethically and professionally".

A UN report found three examples of Israel using Palestinian children as human shields in 2022.

In May 2023, before the beginning of the Gaza war, Defence for Children International – Palestine (DCIP) had already documented that five children had been used as human shields by the Israeli army since the beginning of that year, with two of the victims being 2-year-old twins.

=== Gaza war (2023–present) ===
The abuse of Palestinians as human shields by Israeli forces has been widespread during the war. By October 2024, at least 11 Israeli army squads have deployed human shields in five Gaza cities, often with the support of Israeli intelligence officers. Palestinian detainees, including civilians and children, have been used to check Hamas-built tunnels and other locations where the Israeli army believes Palestinian militants may have set up an ambush or booby trap. Analysis by The New York Times estimates that this practice has become increasingly common during the war. According to soldiers who have either been involved in or witnessed it, the practice is routine. Israeli pundit Amos Harel wrote for Haaretz that the IDF use of Palestinians as human shields has been widespread in the Gaza war, placing it in the context of a more general breakdown of order and discipline among Israeli soldiers that also includes wanton killings of civilians, unjustified torching of homes, and sexual abuse and torture of prisoners of war. International law scholar Michael N. Schmitt, interviewed by the Times, said he was unaware of any other military force that had used either civilians or prisoners of war as human shields in recent decades. Philippe Lazzarini, head of UNRWA, the UN agency responsible for ensuring the rights of Palestinian refugees, which has been the target of repeated violent attacks and arbitrary actions by Israel, also accused the Israeli army of using its personnel as human shields in the course of this war. Neve Gordon, an Israeli professor of International Law at Queen Mary University of London, stated that Israel's use of human shields was "two war crimes in a single action."

An investigation by the DCIP has detailed that the Israeli army used several children as human shields in the Al-Tuffah area of Gaza City on 27 December 2023. On that occasion, 50 Palestinians were detained, including children. Two brothers, aged 12 and 13, told investigators that soldiers forced them to strip off, tied their hands and forced them to walk in front of Israeli tanks along with other Palestinians. The younger brother also reported being slapped, kicked and beaten by the Israelis.

On 16 January 2024, a Palestinian shop owner in the West Bank village of Dura in Hebron accused IDF soldiers of using him as a human shield. Mobile phone video footage shows an Israeli soldier walking down the street with the man in front of him, as the soldier laid a rifle on the victim's shoulder.

The DCIP reported that Israeli forces used three boys aged 12 to 14 as human shields in separate incidents in Tulkarem in the beginning of May 2024. A UN report on child abuse committed during the Gaza war verified five cases since 7 October where Israeli forces have used Palestinian boys as human shields during "law enforcement operations" in the West Bank.

In May 2024, the Israeli Nahal Brigade used an 80-year-old Palestinian man as a human shield by tying an explosive cord around his neck and threatening to have his head blown off. The elderly man had remained in northern Gaza due to mobility issues for himself and his wife. Despite being able to move only with the help of a cane, the Israelis forced him to work as a shield for 8 hours, walking in front of soldiers as they searched the area, while his wife remained detained at home. After the ordeal was over, the soldiers ordered the victim and his wife to flee to the "humanitarian zone" in southern Gaza. These soldiers, however, made no effort to contact other divisions about the couple, who, when spotted on their way by other Israeli groups, was ultimately executed.

On 22 June 2024, a video was posted of an injured Palestinian man, 23-year-old Mujahed Abbadeh, strapped to the hood of an Israeli jeep driving through Jenin. Another eyewitness asserted that the IDF paraded the wounded man around on the hood, keeping the victim under the hot sun for several minutes, until handing him over to a Palestinian Red Cross ambulance which was parked nearby. This, the source argued, was evidence that the wounded man was not a suspect, as the IDF later maintained. A UN expert said the incident amounted to taking human shields. A cousin of Abbadeh told the press that Israeli forces had recently done the same to three other people. Two other Palestinians subsequently came forth and testified to the BBC, showing video evidence, that they too had been shot and strapped to a jeep in a different operation.

On the night of 28 August 2024, during an incursion into Tulkarm, it was reported that Israeli troops had used a 10-year-old girl, Malak Shihab, as a human shield in the Nur Shams refugee camp. A woman and four children were forced away from their home while one girl was detained and, intimidated also by an unmuzzled military dog unleashed to sniff her, ordered to successively open the doors in her aunt's house.

According to a Haaretz investigation based on many Israeli soldiers' testimonies, Palestinian teenagers and adults are regularly used as human shields in exploring the tunnel network in the Gaza Strip. Termed "shawashim" by Israeli soldiers, they are dressed up, apart from sandshoes, to look like Israeli soldiers, handcuffed, blindfolded and, with a video camera attached to their bodies, sent into houses where Hamas combatants are suspected to hide, or into tunnels that might be booby-trapped. On occasion even elderly Palestinian men have been forced to undertake this work. The practice is said to be widely known to IDF field commanders. They would use Palestinians when neither sniffer dogs nor drones were available. An October 2024 investigation by CNN found that while the scale and scope of the practice was unknown, testimony from civilians and an Israeli soldier showed Israel's use of Palestinians as human shields was widespread across the Gaza Strip. In November 2024, an investigation by The Washington Post further corroborated these investigations, with witnesses, victims, and an Israeli soldier stating civilians were being used as human shield to prevent harm to Israeli soldiers.

In November 2024, Defence for Children International reported on three separate incidents, during 15–20 October 2024, of families with young children being used as human shields to protect the Israel Defense Forces in attacks at the Jabalia refugee camp and Indonesia Hospital.

Satellite imagery has demonstrated that Israeli army also used a school in the village of Juhor ad Dik and the Turkish-Palestinian Friendship Hospital as bases for military operations, prompting rebuke from the Turkish government.

CNN reported in October 2024 that the Israeli military had employed a practice called the "mosquito protocol" in northern Gaza, Gaza City, Khan Younis, and Rafah, where Palestinians were forcibly sent into dangerous locations before Israeli forces entered.

The IDF in March 2025 said that "the Military Police Criminal Investigation Division opened investigations after reasonable suspicion arose regarding the use of Palestinians for military missions during the operations".

That same month, CBS News published an interview with an unnamed Israeli soldier who admitted that he had been ordered to use Palestinians instead of trained dogs to search buildings and that his unit had also committed other war crimes, such as blowing up buildings for no reason. The network also heard from a 14-year-old Palestinian named Omri Salem that he and his nine-year-old cousin were used as human shields by Israeli soldiers in the West Bank and that they were beaten by the soldiers when they tried to resist orders.

The Associated Press in May 2025 reported that the Israeli military was commonly using Palestinians as human shields in Gaza, citing accounts from two Israeli soldiers admitting doing so, as well as allegations from seven Palestinians that they were used as human shields in Gaza and the occupied West Bank. The reported locations were West Bank's Jenin refugee camp, Gaza's Khan Yunis, Shuja'iyya, Nasser Hospital, Al Amal Hospital, Kamal Adwan Hospital, and the Jabaliya refugee camp. The practice was described as the "mosquito protocol", with the Palestinians also labelled as "wasps", the Associated Press reported.

According to the Associated Press, one Israeli military officer alleged that orders to use human shields often came from higher command, and that this practice "caught on like fire in a field" after the soldiers saw "how effective and easy it was", such that by the end of his nine-month stint in Gaza, every infantry unit used a Palestinian as a human shield to clear houses before the unit went in. The officer described a 2024 meeting where a brigade commander suggested to a division commander that they "get a mosquito" and "catch one off the streets." The officer said he twice reported the usage of human shields to his brigade commander, and that the reports were supposed to be forwarded to the division commander, while the Israeli Defense Forces declined to comment to the Associated Press on whether it had the reports. One Israeli military sergeant said that his unit had rejected the usage of human shields in 2024, but were overruled, with an officer telling them to ignore international humanitarian law, and thus his unit used a 16-year-old and a 30-year-old as human shields for a few days, who appeared to cry out for their freedom.

An investigative report published in June 2026 detailed the testimony of an anonymous Israeli infantry soldier, obtained via the Israeli NGO Breaking the Silence, who admitted his unit routinely used a captured Palestinian civilian as a human shield. The soldier stated that the practice, which troops referred to as the "mosquito protocol", was actively used as a substitute for sniffer dogs to clear houses, look for ambushes, and check for booby traps such as improvised explosive devices. According to his account, the civilian, who had been cleared by Israeli intelligence as having no ties to Hamas, was bound at night next to a guard post, and the platoon frequently discussed how much food to give him or whether he should be beaten. The soldier described the protocol as "messy and not organized" rather than a formal bureaucratic procedure, noting that when his unit rotated out of operations, they simply ordered the man to leave. The report further noted that in addition to "mosquitoes", the IDF has deployed individuals referred to as "wasps" (Palestinians from the West Bank forced into IDF uniforms) and "beavers" (Arabic-speaking Sudanese asylum-seekers offered residency permits in exchange for scouting tunnels) to minimize Israeli military casualties.

==== Fatalities ====
In August 2024 in the city of Rafah, one victim was a man forced to search buildings in Khan Younis when a commander from Israel's Nahal Brigade arrived who did not know the victim. The commander immediately identified the victim as a Palestinian and, unaware that he was carrying out work for the Israeli army, proceeded to pull out a rifle and kill him immediately.

An Israeli officer told the Associated Press that two Palestinians had died while the Israeli military used them as shields - the first lost consciousness in a tunnel, and the second was shot by Israeli soldiers when running into a house, as the soldiers did not know that another Israeli unit was using this man as a shield.

== Use by Palestinian forces ==
Accusations against Palestinian militant groups including Hamas that they use Palestinian civilians as shields are commonly made by Israel and allied countries but have been contested by independent investigations; use of Israeli civilians as shields in the 7 October attack, however, has been evidenced by victim testimony.

As early as 2004 Amos Harel wrote in Haaretz that during the Second Intifada (2000–2005) Palestinian gunmen "routinely" used civilians and children as human shields and claimed that there was photographic evidence for it.

On 22 November 2006, Human Rights Watch accused Muhammad Wail Baroud, a military commander in the Popular Resistance Committee, of using civilians for shielding homes against military attacks but later stated that they erred. There was no evidence that the house was being used for military purposes at the time of the planned attack, nor did the IDF explain what military objective it could have had. They considered the destruction in light of Israel's longstanding policy of destroying homes as punitive measures instead of as legitimate military targets. Human Rights Watch acknowledged they did not consider the motives of the civilians, such as whether they willingly assembled or not, and emphasized that it did not want to criticize non-violent resistance or any other form of peaceful protest, including civilians defending their homes. Former UN human rights official Craig Mokhiber has said that UN investigations into Israel's 2008 and 2014 wars in Gaza found there was no evidence that Palestinian fighters had used Palestinians as human shields, and maintains instead that Israel cynically uses such allegations to justify the intentional killing of Palestinian civilians.

Hamas has frequently faced accusations of using human shields – placing non-combatants in the line of fire to prevent military objectives from being targeted without harming the non-combatant – throughout the Gaza–Israel conflict. Hamas has denied the accusations; while it has been found to operate in and launch attacks from civilian areas, endangering non-combatants, human rights groups say this does not equate to human shielding under international law.

In 2019, NATO released a report saying that Hamas had begun using human shields in 2007. Israel claimed that Hamas used human shields during the 2008–2009 Gaza War and the 2014 Gaza War. Amnesty International investigated and found no evidence to support these claims. They found that Hamas launched rockets from civilian areas and had urged residents to ignore Israeli evacuation warnings, but those actions do not qualify as using human shields. They said that Hamas's suggestion to ignore evacuation warnings might have been intended to minimize panic and displacement. Human Rights Watch (HRW) also found no evidence that Hamas used human shields during the 2009 conflict. Similarly, a 2009 UN fact finding mission found no evidence that Palestinian armed groups used mosques, hospitals or ambulances for military purposes, or that civilians were forced by Hamas or other factions to remain in areas under Israeli attack to be used as human shields.

During the Gaza war, Israel, other nations, and the UN Secretary-General accused Hamas of using hospitals as human shields. In 2024, HRW reported at least two incidents where Palestinian fighters appeared to have used Israeli hostages as human shields during the October 7 attacks in Kibbutz Be'eri and Nahal Oz. In November 2024, the UN reported that in most instances, Israel does not provide substantial evidence for its human shields allegations in Gaza nor could they independently verify these allegations. The UN raised concerns regarding the actions of Palestinian armed groups and their compliance with international humanitarian law with respect to locating military objectives near densely populated areas and placement of civilians in areas regarded as military objectives.

Human rights groups have noted that Israel must still abide by international law – especially the principle of proportionality – regardless if human shields were used by Hamas. Israel itself has used Palestinians as human shields, and international rights scholars have argued Israel exploits the allegations against Hamas to cover up atrocities against Palestinian civilians and pre-empt sanctions for breaches of international law.

=== Hamas ===
Hamas has been accused of using human shields in the Gaza Strip, purposely attempting to shield itself from Israeli attacks by storing weapons in civilian infrastructure, launching rockets from residential areas, and telling residents to ignore Israeli warnings to flee. Israel has accused Hamas of maintaining command and control bunkers and tunnel infrastructure below hospitals, with some of the accusations being supported by the United States, the European Union, and the United Nations Secretary General. Israel has said that Hamas's actions have caused Israel to kill civilians as collateral damage. Hamas has denied using civilians and civilian infrastructure, including hospitals, as human shields. In 2019, the NATO Strategic Communications Centre of Excellence said that Hamas began using human shields in conflicts with Israel in 2007.

==== Response by Hamas ====
In 2008, Hamas MP Fathi Hamad stated on a TV speech that "For the Palestinian people, death has become an industry, at which women excel, and all the people living on this land excel. The elderly excel at it, and so do the mujahideen and the children. This is why they have created a human shield of women, children, the elderly, and the mujahideen, to oppose the Zionist bombing machine. It is as if they are saying to the Zionist enemy: 'We desire death just as you desire life.'" Some commentators argued that his speech is self-acknowledgment of using Human shields. A UN fact-finding mission said that although his rhetoric is "morally repugnant", it doesn't constitute evidence that Hamas is using Human shields.

in 2009, Hamas said it "did not use human shields and did not fire rockets from residential areas" during the 2008–2009 war. In 2014, Hamas denied that it had used human shields, and they pointed to prior United Nations investigations of claims that it had fired rockets from schools finding the allegations to be untrue. Hamas leaders said that the extremely high population density in Gaza resulted in Hamas operating near civilian areas. In a 2014 televised interview, senior Hamas spokesman Sami Abu Zuhri stated: "The policy of people confronting the Israeli warplanes with their bare chests in order to protect their homes has proven effective against the occupation... we in Hamas call upon our people to adopt this policy in order to protect the Palestinian homes."

In 2023, Hamas said it did not use Al-Shifa Hospital as a human shield, saying the allegations have "no basis in truth".

==== Denial of civilian status ====
Danny Danon, then the Israeli ambassador to the UN, said of the 2018–2019 Gaza border protests that "terrorists continue to hide behind innocent children to ensure their own survival", with Gordon and Perugini remarking that the framing of protestors as terrorists or human shields effectively "categorizes any Palestinian from Gaza who participates in civil protests as a terrorist who is consequently killable"; they find that the usage of the human shield accusation both during war and civil protest has caused the very idea of a Palestinian civilian to have "disappeared" in Israeli discourse.

==== 2008–2009 Gaza War ====
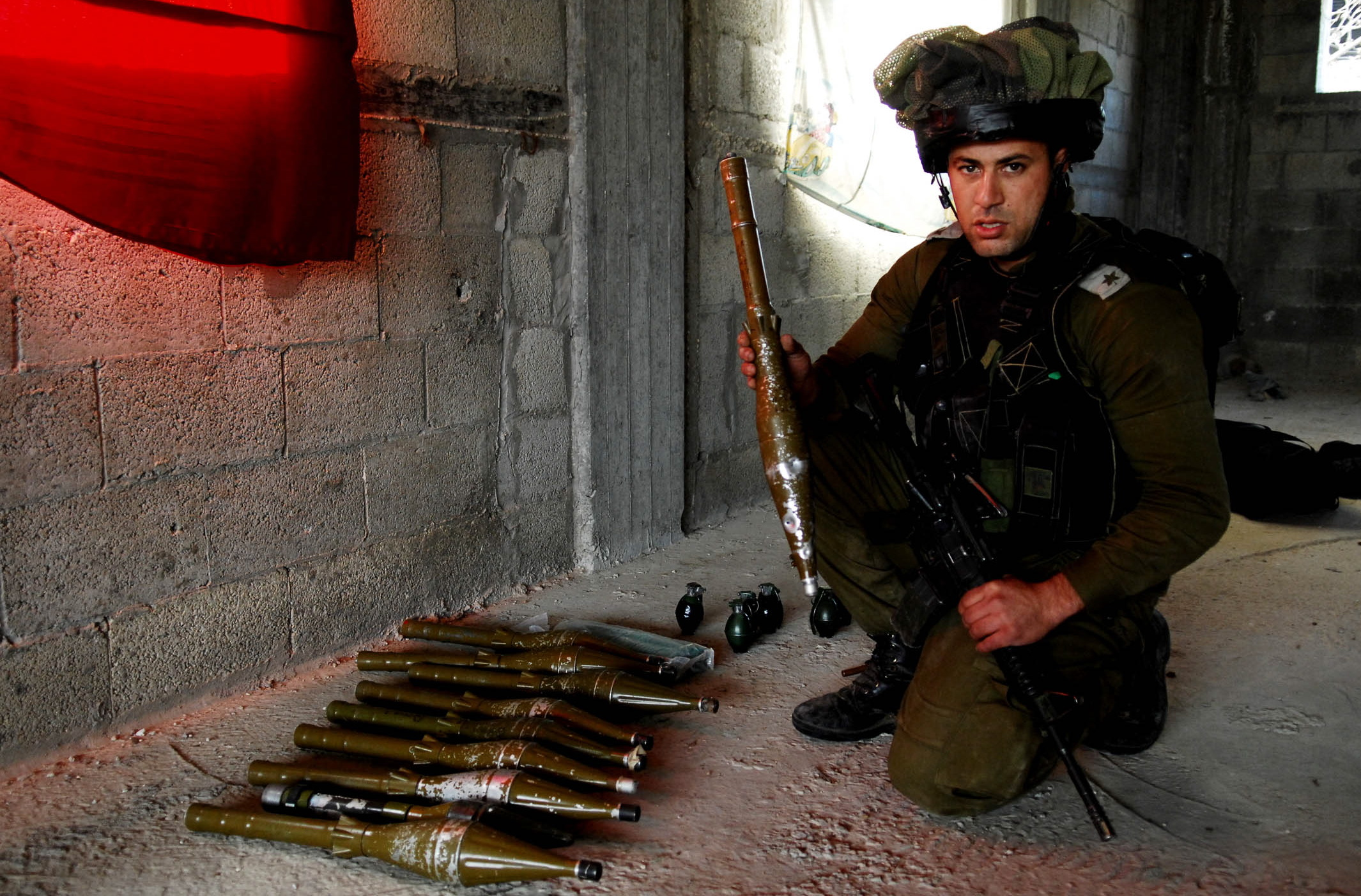
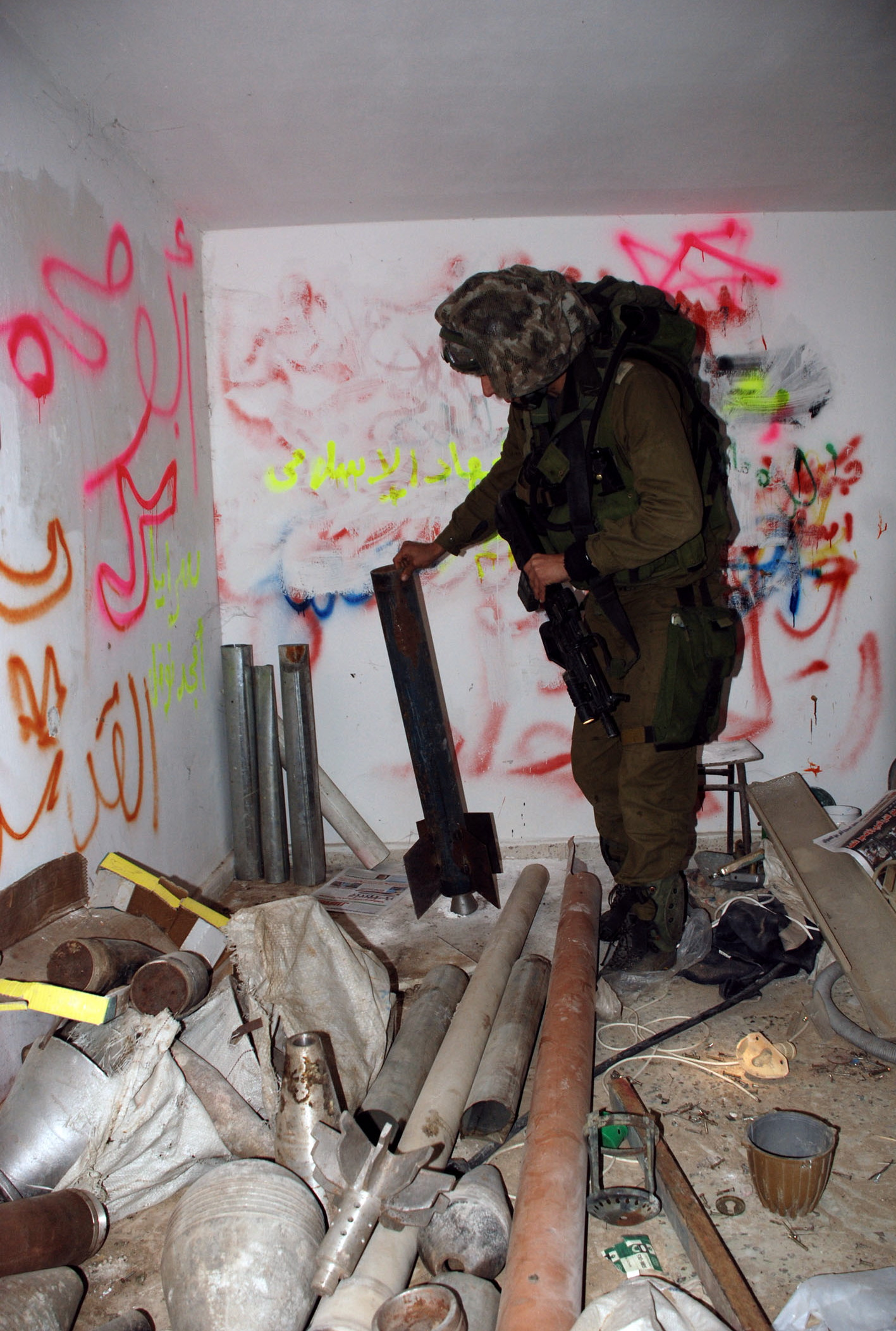
Photographs released by the IDF allegedly showing Hamas weapons found in mosques, 2008

During the 2008–2009 Gaza War, Israel destroyed numerous civilian targets, including schools, mosques, UNRWA buildings, bridges, government administration buildings, courthouses, police stations, fire stations, agricultural facilities, bird farms etc. Israel claimed it attacked these areas because Hamas fighters allegedly returned fire on Israeli troops from there. However, George Bisharat disputes Israel's claims. He stated that the war began with an Israeli surprise attack on civilian targets, including a graduation ceremony at a local police college, and that there was no Hamas return fire at the time of the assault. Bisharat also said that, in the final days of the war, after Hamas resistance had ceased and Israeli forces had withdrawn, Israel targeted and destroyed Gaza's remaining industrial infrastructure.

The IDF stated the ceremony was targeted because of the presence of some who they said were affiliated with or members of Hamas. However, the Goldstone Commission report on the 2008–2009 Gaza War concluded that the strike constituted a military attack on civilian police forces, which is prohibited under international law. Its report stated:

The Commission was unable to verify the claims regarding police membership in armed organizations. Furthermore, in half of the cases, the claims are based on the equation that membership in Hamas is membership in the Izz ad-Din al-Qassam Brigades, which in the Commission's view is unjustified. Finally, even according to a study attributed to the Israeli government (this is a study by Lt. Col. (res.) Yonatan Duhoch Halevi, which will be detailed below), 34 police officers with no affiliation to Hamas or other armed Palestinian organizations were killed in the military attack, a large number of them in the shelling of police stations on the first day of the operation. As a high probability, the committee found that the police officers who were killed were not linked to any military activity at the time of the attack and did not take part in preparations for the battle. At other police stations, the police officers were involved in a variety of routine tasks, including interrogating detainees and dealing with the problems of the public who were present at the police facilities, in the middle of a normal day.

Amnesty International investigated Israeli claims that Hamas used human shields during the 2008–2009 Gaza War and the 2014 Gaza War but found no evidence to support these claims. During the war, Amnesty International pointed to several cases of destruction of houses, schools and mosques, which Israel said were housing ammunition; Amnesty found no example of "secondary conflagration", which would be expected if weapons were present. In their report on the 2008–2009 war, Amnesty stated they found no evidence of Hamas directing civilians to shield military assets or forcing them to stay near buildings used by fighters. They did find that Hamas launched rockets from civilian areas, which endangered civilians and violated the requirement to protect civilians from military action, but this does not qualify as shielding under international law. In 2014, Amnesty reported they had no evidence that Hamas or other Palestinian armed groups intentionally used civilians as shields to protect specific locations or military assets from Israeli attacks. They suggested that Hamas's urging of residents to ignore Israeli evacuation warnings might have been intended to minimize panic and displacement, rather than to use civilians as human shields.

In a post-war analysis of the conflict, Amnesty International stated that: "Contrary to repeated allegations by Israeli officials of the use of "human shields", Amnesty International found no evidence that Hamas or other Palestinian fighters directed the movement of civilians to shield military objectives... [nor] that Hamas or other armed groups forced residents to stay in or around buildings used by fighters, nor that fighters prevented residents from leaving buildings or areas which had been commandeered by militants." Amnesty also found that Hamas "launched rockets and located military equipment and positions near civilian homes" – though not necessarily when civilians were present – "endangering the lives of the inhabitants by exposing them to the risk of Israeli attacks".

Human Rights Watch (HRW) also stated they found no evidence that Hamas used human shields during the 2009 conflict. Human rights groups have said that "even if Hamas were using human shields", Israel must still abide by international law, especially the principle of proportionality.

==== 2014 Gaza War ====
Numerous reports during the 2014 Gaza War stated that Hamas used human shields. The UN High Commissioner for Human Rights Navi Pillay accused Hamas militants of violating international humanitarian law by "locating rockets within schools and hospitals, or even launching these rockets from densely populated areas". A UN inquiry found "weapons had been placed inside an UNRWA school in the Hamas-run Gaza Strip and that it was highly likely that an unidentified Palestinian armed group could have used the school premises to launch attacks." The European Union condemned Hamas, and in particular condemned "calls on the civilian population of Gaza to provide themselves as human shields". In an August 2014 interview, Hamas political leader Khaled Mashal said to a CNN interviewer that the group did not use its people as human shields. In a September 2014 interview, a Hamas official acknowledged to Associated Press that the group fired at Israel from civilian areas. He ascribed the practice to "mistakes", but said the group had little option due to the crowded landscape of the Strip, with its dearth of open zones. He denied accusations that rockets were launched "from schools or hospitals when in fact they were fired 200 or 300 meters (yards) away".

In interviews with Gazan refugees, reporters for The Independent and The Guardian concluded it was a "myth" that Hamas forced civilians to stay in areas under attack against their will; many refugees told them they refused to heed the IDF's warnings because even areas Israel had declared safe for refugees had been shelled by its forces. The BBC Middle East editor Jeremy Bowen also said he "saw no evidence of Hamas using Palestinians as human shields". An Amnesty International document (dated 25 July 2014) asserts that they do "not have evidence at this point that Palestinian civilians have been intentionally used by Hamas or Palestinian armed groups during the current hostilities to 'shield' specific locations or military personnel or equipment from Israeli attacks". Amnesty International's assessment was that international humanitarian law was clear in that "even if officials or fighters from Hamas or Palestinian armed groups associated with other factions did in fact direct civilians to remain in a specific location in order to shield military objectives from attacks, all of Israel's obligations to protect these civilians would still apply". The human rights group, however, still found that Palestinian factions, as in previous conflicts, launched attacks from civilian areas.

During the conflict, Hamas spokespeople reportedly urged residents in some areas of the Gaza Strip not to heed Israeli military evacuation warnings and to remain in their homes. This prompted accusations from Israel that the group was utilizing the population as human shields, and led the European Union to issue a formal statement strongly condemning calls on civilians to "provide themselves as human shields." For Amnesty International, however, these generalized public statements could have been motivated by a desire to avoid further panic, given Gaza's lack of shelters and reports of fleeing civilians coming under fire. Amnesty further noted that public statements directed at entire areas do not legally equate to the war crime of directing specific civilians to shield military targets. Hamas's broader rhetorical stance on civilian casualties during the conflict drew further scrutiny; in 2014, Hamas spokesperson Sami Abu Zuhri stated on Al-Aqsa TV, "Hamas despises those defeatist Palestinians that criticize the high number of civilian casualties. The resistance praises our people... we lead our people to death... I mean, to war."

During the war, Israel also damaged hospitals, alleging they were concealing "hidden missiles". A team of Finnish journalists from Helsingin Sanomat working at the Gaza Al-Shifa hospital reported seeing rockets fired from near the Al-Shifa hospital. However, two Norwegian doctors who have been working at the hospital for decades have denied there was militant presence nearby, saying the last armed man they saw by the building was an Israeli doctor at the time of the First Intifada. In 2014, The Guardian journalists came across "armed men" inside one hospital, and sightings of "senior Hamas leaders" have been reported inside another. The Washington Post described Al-Shifa hospital as a "de facto headquarters for Hamas leaders, who can be seen in the hallways and offices". French-Palestinian journalist Radjaa Abu Dagg reported being interrogated by an armed Hamas member inside Al-Shifa Hospital and ordered to leave Gaza.

In 2015, The Washington Post said that an Amnesty International report condemned Palestinian militias for storing munitions in, and launching rockets from civilian structures and reported that the launching of attacks and storing of rockets "very near locations where hundreds of displaced civilians were taking shelter." The report stated "the available evidence indicates that Palestinian armed groups fired rockets and mortars from residential areas during the July/August 2014 conflict, and that on at least some occasions, projectiles were launched in close proximity to civilian buildings...significant areas within the 365km2 of territory are not residential, and conducting hostilities or launching munitions from these areas presents a lower risk of endangering Palestinian civilians...Palestinian armed groups stored rockets and other munitions in civilian buildings and facilities, including UN schools, during the conflict... storing munitions in civilian buildings or launching attacks from the vicinity of civilian buildings, violate the obligation to take all feasible precautions to protect civilians from the effects of attacks. But they do not necessarily amount to the specific violation of using "human shields" under international humanitarian law, which entails "using the presence (or movements) of civilians or other protected persons to render certain points or areas (or military forces) immune from military operations." According to Philip Luther, Director of the Middle East and North Africa Programme at Amnesty International, "evidence suggesting that a rocket launched by a Palestinian armed group may have caused 13 civilian deaths inside Gaza underscores how indiscriminate these weapons can be and the dreadful consequences of using them". He also stated that "the devastating impact of Israeli attacks on Palestinian civilians during the conflict is undeniable, but violations by one side in a conflict can never justify violations by their opponents."

==== 2018-2019 Gaza border protests ====
===== Rouzan al-Najjar =====
Rouzan al-Najjar was a Palestinian nurse/paramedic who lived in Khuzaa, a village near the Gaza Strip's border with Israel. Her family lived in an apartment within eyeshot of Israeli soldiers stationed over the border. Their area had a four-metre-high (13 ft) concrete wall installed to shield local residents from Israeli fire.

She was killed by the Israel Defense Forces (IDF) while volunteering as a medic during the 2018 Gaza border protests. She was fatally hit by a bullet shot by an Israeli soldier as she tried to help evacuate the wounded near Israel's border fence with Gaza. The IDF first denied that she was targeted, while not ruling out that she may have been hit by indirect fire. Israeli human rights group B'Tselem said that al-Najjar was shot intentionally.

After her death, the IDF released footage in which she purportedly admitted to participating in the protests as a human shield at the request of Hamas. The video was later found to be a clip from an interview with a Lebanese television station that had been edited by the IDF to take al-Najjar's comments out of context. In the unedited video, she didn't mention Hamas and called herself a "rescuing human shield to protect and save the wounded at the front lines", with everything following "human shield" trimmed out of the Israeli clip. The IDF was widely criticized for attempting posthumous character assassination by tampering with the video.

==== Destruction of media tower in Gaza ====
In 2021, Israel bombed a skyscraper in Gaza that housed several international media outlets, including the Associated Press and Al Jazeera. Israel claimed that Hamas officers were operating from the building and that such deployment amounted to human shields. This claim was denied by journalists working there. Despite claiming to have evidence of Hamas's misuse of the facility and promising to release it, Israel has never substantiated its allegations. The attack was condemned by the Committee to Protect Journalists. Reporters Without Borders called for a war crimes investigation by the International Criminal Court. Gary Pruitt, CEO of the Associated Press, said the news agency was "shocked and horrified that the Israeli military would target and destroy the building housing AP's bureau and other news organizations in Gaza". He added that "the world will know less about what is happening in Gaza because of what happened today."

==== 2023-present Gaza war ====
===== Israeli accusations =====
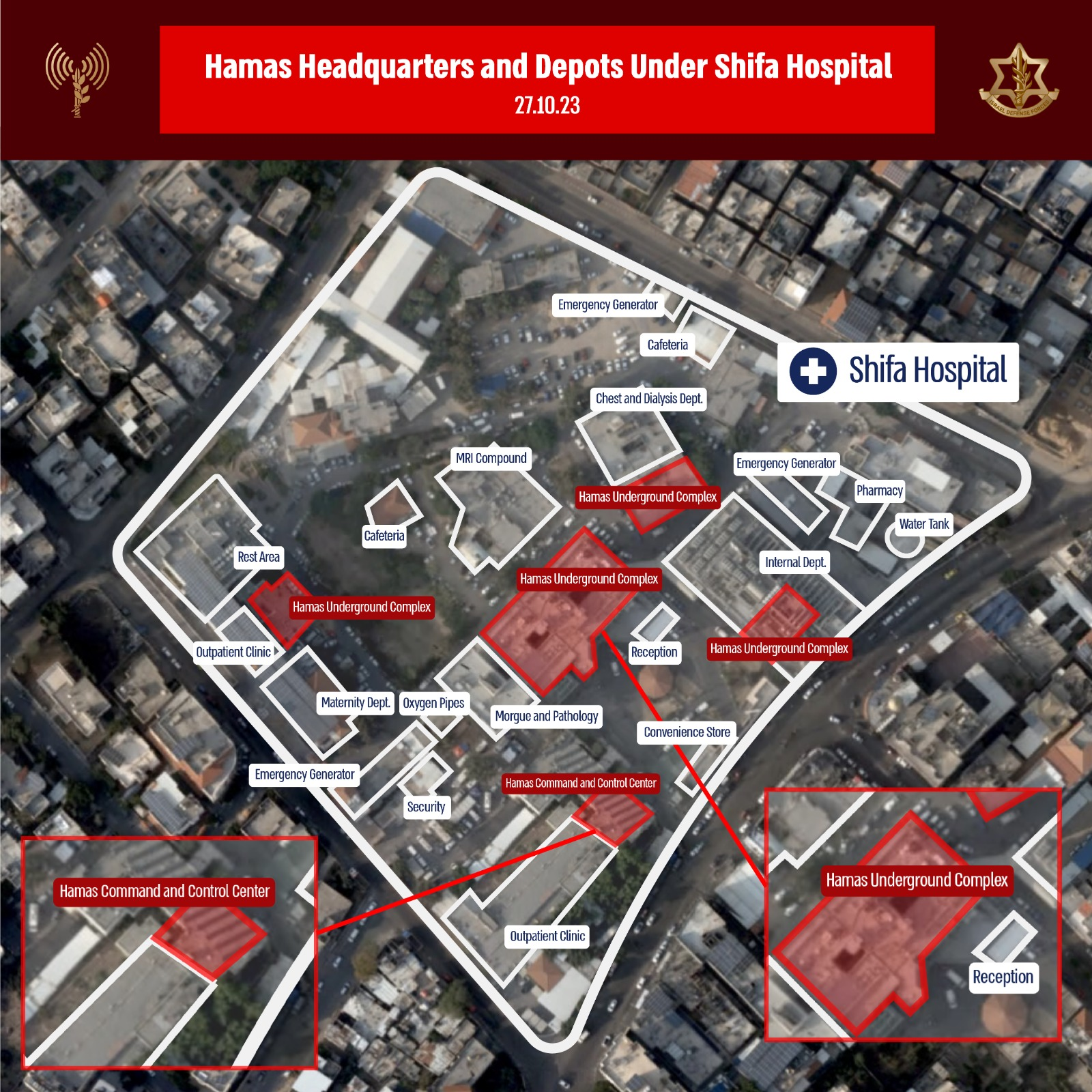
Map released by IDF Spokesperson's Unit alleging military use of the al-Shifa hospital compound

External videos
- Pentagon Spokesperson: Hamas has a command center under Al Shifa hospital in Gaza City

During the 2023 Gaza War, Israel stated that Hamas has strategically placed portions of its military tunnel system and command network beneath civilian infrastructure, including Gaza's al-Shifa Hospital. Israel released what it said were videos of confessions of two alleged members of Hamas' armed wing in which the people on camera supported the assertion that Hamas militants are using hospitals as a means of protection from IDF strikes. Human Rights Watch, Amnesty International and Physicians for Human Rights Israel have denounced such taped alleged confessions, stating that they were likely extracted under torture, violate international law and basic human rights, and should be considered inadmissible as credible evidence. They also called on the Israeli government to cease publishing taped "confessions".

The Israeli army accused Hamas of sending over one hundred women and children to a compound it was targeting to act as human shields. It said two of its soldiers were killed while withdrawing from the compound.

On 8 November, the IDF and Shin Bet footage from what it said was an intercepted phone call and the interrogations of terrorists who participated in the October 7 massacre. The Times of Israel reported that "an apparent Hamas operative" said to another man in Gaza that he "can leave with any ambulance" he wants.

Israel accused Hamas of "double war crimes" in using civilian locations to launch attacks. An IDF spokesman told CBS News that "a systemic abuse by Hamas of sites and locations that are supposed to enjoy special protection under the Geneva Convention and humanitarian law". The IDF shared with CBS photos it said showed Hamas members launching rockets from near UN facilities.

On 18 November CNN aired footage taken by the IDF showing what the IDF claims was a person armed with an RPG launcher entering the premises of Al-Quds Hospital.

On 19 November, the IDF released footage of an underground tunnel under al-Shifa. The tunnel, which is 160 meter long and 10 meter deep, passes directly under the Qatari building of the hospital; it has air-conditioned rooms, bathrooms, a kitchenette, electricity connections and communication infrastructure, and is protected by a blast door. The IDF also released CCTV footage that appears to show two of the hostages being led in the hospital's corridors, as well as Hamas and stolen IDF vehicles in its courtyard. Hamas had previously publicized taking hostages to receive medical treatment. On 21 December, The Washington Post published analysis concluding that the hospital buildings in question were not actually connected to the tunnels.

According to Israel, Ahmad Kahlot, who they reported to be the director of Kamal Adwan Hospital in northern Gaza, while being interrogated by the Shin Bet said that Hamas had taken control of the hospital as a military operations center and that he himself was Hamas member. Israel said that during the interrogation he said that many hospital staff members served in the al-Qassam brigades. According to the Israeli military, he said that Hamas used the hospital for holding an IDF soldier hostage and employed ambulances to transport the bodies of Israeli hostage and that Hamas had separate offices, ambulances, and equipment with distinct colors and signs.

On 1 January 2024, the Jerusalem Post released selected footage of the IDF's Unit 504 interrogations of Hamas and Palestinian Islamic Jihad militants. The investigation alleged various tactics Hamas employed to exploit Gazan civilians. Zohadi Ali Zahadi Shahin, an alleged Hamas member, said Hamas prevented civilians from fleeing towards Rafah crossing and instead relocated them to Al-Shifa Hospital where they were kept while Hamas terrorists hid in tunnels underneath. Shahin also said Hamas terrorists would forcibly take over civilian homes, plant explosives, and intimidate residents, with one militant threatening Shahin directly. Another alleged operative, Muhammad Darwish Amara from Palestinian Islamic Jihad, said Hamas planted a bomb in his home where his children were staying to coerce him into participating in terrorist activities.

These interrogations and use of selected video footage of alleged confessions by alleged Hamas militants have been widely criticized by human rights organizations as they likely involve the use of torture, do not give due process to detainees, and are selectively edited for release.

In March 2025, Israel reduced the Turkish-Palestinian Friendship Hospital – the only one specializing in cancer treatment in Gaza – to rubble in a controlled explosion, saying the hospital was being used as a military base by Hamas. Israel has not provided evidence of the accusation, and media investigations had previously reported that it was Israeli soldiers who were using the hospital.

===== Hamas responses =====
In October 2023, Hamas official Mousa Abu Marzook argued in a RT Arabic interview that because 75% of Gaza's population consists of refugees, their protection is the responsibility of the United Nations, adding that under the Geneva Conventions, it is the obligation of Israel, as the occupying power, to provide for the needs of the civilian population.

===== International reactions =====
White House National Security Council spokesperson John Kirby said that the United States has intelligence indicating that Hamas is using the Shifa Hospital in Gaza City for military purposes, possibly for weapon storage and also for holding captives. National Security Adviser Jake Sullivan stated that "you can see even from open-source reporting that Hamas does use hospitals, along with a lot of other civilian facilities, for command-and-control, for storing weapons, for housing its fighters... this is Hamas' track record, both historically and in this conflict". According to another US official, "Hamas has a command node under the Al-Shifa hospital, uses fuel intended for it and its fighters regularly cluster in and around [it]." The US assessment that Hamas and other Palestinian militants were operating within the Al-Shifa hospital included communication intercepts of fighters inside the complex.

During the Gaza war of 2023–2024, EU nations accused Hamas of using hospitals as human shields, while the UN Secretary General said "Hamas and other militants use civilians as human shields". In 2023, HRW said that "Hamas and other Palestinian armed groups need to take all feasible precautions to protect civilians under their control from the effects of attacks and not use civilians as 'human shields'". In 2024, HRW reported at least two incidents where Palestinian fighters appear to have used Israeli hostages as human shields during the October 7 attacks in Kibbutz Be'eri and Nahal Oz.

In November 2024, the UN reported that in most instances Israel does not provide substantial evidence for its human shields allegations in Gaza nor could they independently verify these allegations. The same report raised concerns regarding the actions of Palestinian armed groups and their compliance with International Humanitarian Law with respect to locating military objectives near densely populated areas and placement of civilians in areas regarded as military objectives under IHL. Nonetheless, they stressed that "Regardless of any use of human shields, Israel must uphold the principles of distinction, proportionality and precautions in attack".

US President Joe Biden stated that Hamas was using innocent Palestinians as human shields and emphasized the need to protect them. US Secretary of State, Antony Blinken, called on Hamas to stop using civilians as human shields. Secretary-General of the UN Antonio Guterres has also stated that Hamas and other Palestinian factions have been using civilians as human shields.

During a UN Security Council meeting on the Middle East held on 24 October 2023, UK Minister of State for Security, Tom Tugendhat, asserted, "We know that Hamas are using innocent Palestinian civilians as human shields; they have embedded themselves in civilian communities." Germany's Foreign Minister, Annalena Baerbock, said: "We must not be fooled by Hamas' playbook," and emphasizing "their use of women and children in Gaza as human shields, and their hiding of weapons under supermarkets, apartment blocks, and even hospitals." Philippe Kridelka, Jean Asselborn, and Sergiy Kyslytsya, representing Belgium, Luxembourg, and Ukraine, respectively, also expressed condemnation for Hamas's use of civilians as human shields.

On 13 November 2023, 27 European Union nations jointly condemned Hamas for the use of hospitals and civilians as human shields.

During the Gaza war, Francesca Albanese, the UN special rapporteur on the occupied Palestinian territories, stated that Israel's labeling of every Palestinian casualty as a "human shield" in the Gaza Strip was "transforming everything and everyone into either a target or collateral damage, hence killable or destroyable."

===== Response by locals =====
After the 2024 Nuseirat rescue operation, locals criticized Hamas for hiding hostages within the houses of civilians.

In the aftermath of the Al-Tabaeen school attack in August 2024, which killed 80 people who had taken shelter in the school, Israel justified its actions by accusing some of the fatalities of being members of militant groups and using the others as shields. Relatives of the accused by Israel, however, described them as a Beit Hanoon Hospital administration director, a retired principal, and scholar of Arabic language and literature; one of the people named by Israel was a man who had already been killed in December 2023. "Israel is always looking for flimsy excuses to target civilians, especially in shelters," said the daughter of one of the victims.

In some buildings being used as shelters by civilians, they have refused to have Gaza police stationed at the shelters and deny entry to any armed person. Civilians in many such shelters have set up their own committees to oversee food, water, and medical distribution, with the presence of weapons being strictly banned regardless of political affiliations or membership of powerful clans and families.

===== Media coverage =====
According to a New York Times report, "Hamas has long been accused of using civilians as human shields and positioning underground bunkers, weapon depots and rocket launchers under or near schools, mosques and hospitals."

DW military analyst Frank Ledwidge has said that "it's been described... as 'common knowledge' that many of the headquarters [of Hamas] are located under hospitals... [with] entries and exits in places like mosques or schools... [or even] UN facilities... that's why we've seen... so many non-combatant casualties so far".

John Spencer has said that "[Hamas has] built many of their tunnel entrances and exits and passageway underneath protected sites like hospitals, schools, mosques, because it restricts the use of force that the IDF can take without going through the... laws of war calculation".

According to Daphne Richemond-Barak, associate professor of counter-terrorism at Reichman University and author of the 2017 book Underground Warfare, Hamas militants operate under Al-Shifa Hospital gain "the highest level of protection available under the laws of war", as well as a "unique opportunity to operate far from surveillance drones, GPS, and other intelligence-gathering technology". She added that "in Gaza, tunnels are dug in civilian homes, pass under entire neighbourhoods, and lead into populated areas inside Israel... [which] enables Hamas to conceal entry and exit points, and facilitates undetected movement and activity."

Avi Issacharoff has said that Hamas militants are "under the houses and neighborhoods of Gaza City, hoping that Israel won't attack them because they're hiding underneath human shields, and that if Israel will attack those neighborhoods, it'll kill many civilians, and the whole world is going to accuse Israel for war crimes". "The sad thing about all this", Issacharoff said, "is [that] Hamas doesn't care about their own people" and aims "not only to kill Israelis but for as many Palestinian civilians [casualties as well]".

Ben Burgis, writing for Jacobin, called Israel's "human shields" defense of "its indiscriminate campaign of bombing apartment buildings, hospitals, ambulances, mosques, churches, and refugee camps in Gaza" an obscenity and compared it to a policeman firing indiscriminately at a criminal who had taken a child hostage.

Following Israel's release of video evidence on 22 November, multiple news agencies concluded that the evidence did not demonstrate the use by Hamas of a command center. The New York Times also said the evidence does not show conclusive evidence of a vast network of tunnels, while Haaretz concluded that Hamas did use the hospital for military purposes. Amnesty International said on 23 November 2023 that "Amnesty International has so far not seen any credible evidence to support Israel's claim that al-Shifa is housing a military command centre" and that "the Israeli military has so far failed to provide credible evidence" for the allegation.

===== Input from other parties =====
Human Rights Watch called on both Israel and Hamas to protect civilians under their control and not use them as "human shields." Human rights organizations have also demanded the release of hostages held by Hamas and cautioned that using them to shield military assets is prohibited under international law.

According to Swedish philosopher Per Bauhn, "moral responsibility for the killing of human shields in the context of morally legitimate attacks on military targets should be assigned to the side that tried to benefit from the presence of the shields in the first place".

=== Analysis ===
==== International law ====
Neve Gordon, professor of international law and human rights at Queen Mary University of London and co-author of the 2020 book Human Shields: A History of People in the Line of Fire, stated in December 2023 that the Israeli military and government's claims of Hamas using Palestinian civilians as human shields "should be understood as a pre-emptive legal defence against accusations that Israel is committing war crimes and crimes against humanity in Gaza." He also accuses state actors such as Israel of using the human shielding allegation to hypocritically justify their own war crimes against civilians: "In recent years the 'human shield' accusation has been adopted by several state militaries trying to justify the killing of civilians in Mosul in Iraq, Raqqa in Syria and elsewhere. This justification, however, functions only in one direction. When state actors kill civilians, it's become standard to describe them as human shields. But when non-state actors attack military targets in urban settings, the civilians they kill are still recognised as civilians." This is endorsed by former United Nations human rights official Craig Mokhiber, who has noticed Israel's own extensive use of Palestinians as human shields.

Gordon and co-author Nicola Perugini also claimed that Israeli accusations of human shields during the Great March of Return were an attempt "to shift the blame from the hunter to the prey, since, according to international law, the party responsible for the death of human shields is not the one killing them but the one using them."

Janina Dill, a laws of war professor at University of Oxford, stated, "Even if Hamas uses civilians as human shields, those civilians are entitled to full protection under international law unless they directly participate in the fighting".

Scholars in international law have cautioned that accusing Hamas of using human shields requires proving intent to shield a military target with civilians. Amnesty International argues that the presence of Hamas weapons in civilian areas is not sufficient to prove intent. They cite "a growing gun culture in Gaza and the increasing internal tensions between Palestinian factions" as other possible reasons for weapons to be found in civilian areas.

==== Strategy ====
According to a paper published by NATO Strategic Communications Centre of Excellence, the tactical deployment of human shields by entities such as Hamas strategically capitalizes on Israel's commitment to reducing unintended civilian harm and the heightened sensitivity of Western audiences to non-combatant casualties. This approach enables Hamas to potentially charge Israel with war crimes when civilian casualties increase due to intensified actions by the Israel Defense Forces (IDF), potentially leading to international sanctions. On the other hand, should the IDF restrain its military engagements to minimize civilian casualties, Hamas gains an advantage, being less exposed to Israeli military strikes and able to safeguard its resources and continue its activities. Moreover, the issue of civilian casualties often creates internal debates within Israeli society, especially between the left-wing, who may critique the operation's consequences, and right-wing factions.

Seen as a form of 'lawfare', according to the Centre of Excellence, this strategy is about leveraging legal frameworks and public sentiment against an adversary, aiming to undermine their legitimacy, engage their resources in legal battles, or secure a victory in the court of public opinion.

According to Charles Freilich, a former Israeli deputy national security advisor, Hamas have strategically embedded their forces among civilian populations, utilizing them as human shields and intentionally provoking Israel to cause civilian casualties in its responses. Simultaneously, Freilich claims that Israel has consistently taken extensive measures to minimize innocent enemy casualties, employing special tactics and risking personnel – a record favorable in comparison to other countries dealing with terrorist threats.

However, Gordon and Perugini have questioned whether the use of human shields by Hamas would be an effective strategy against Israel, because the Israeli military considers a high ratio of civilian casualties permissible and "deterrence is successful only when the attacking party values the shield's humanity and feels morally compelled to stop the attack in order not to harm the person who serves as a shield."

==== As an act of perfidy ====
All combatants, including insurgents, are bound by the law of war.

Louis René Beres believes Hamas is using human shields and this constitutes an act of perfidy, a breach of Article 147 of the Fourth Geneva Convention, the Hague Regulations and Protocol I of 1977, Article 38 of the Statute of the International Court of Justice. By contrast, Stephanie Bouchie de Belle, writing in the International Review of the Red Cross, argues that though the use of human shields is prohibited, it is not an act of perfidy. An act of perfidy, she argues, must necessarily be done with the intent to kill, wound or capture an enemy, but a human shield that defends combatants from enemy attack does not fit the definition of perfidy.

== Activists as human shields ==
International and Israeli activists have voluntarily used themselves as human shields to stop Israeli violence against Palestinians.

Rachel Corrie and Tom Hurndall, Western International Solidarity Movement (ISM) volunteers in the Palestinian territories, who died in 2003 and 2004 respectively have been described as "human shields" campaigning against house demolition. ISM, however, strongly takes offence at the use of the term "human shield" to describe their work, preferring it be used only to refer to when armed combatants uses civilians as shields.

Amnesty International has also rejected the definition of volunteer activist's actions or activist's actions for non-military property as "human shields", and regards only the direction of "specific civilians to remain in their homes as "human shields" for fighters, munitions, or military equipment" as "human shields".

In 2008, Rabbis for Human Rights stated they would act as voluntary "human shields" during the annual olive harvest to protect Palestinian villages from settlers.

== See also ==
- War crimes in the Gaza war
