= Convention for the Protection of Human Rights and Dignity of the Human Being with regard to the Application of Biology and Medicine =

International treaty

Convention on Human Rights and Biomedicine European Convention on Bioethics Oviedo Convention
The Convention for the Protection of Human Rights and Dignity of the Human Being with regard to the Application of Biology and Medicine
- Signed: 4 April 1997
- Location: Oviedo, Spain
- Effective: 1 December 1999
- Condition: 5 Ratifications including 4 Council of Europe Members
- Ratifiers: 29
- Depositary: Secretary General of the Council of Europe
- Languages: English and French

The Convention for the Protection of Human Rights and Dignity of the Human Being with regard to the Application of Biology and Medicine, otherwise known as the European Convention on Bioethics or the European Bioethics Convention, is an international instrument aiming to prohibit the misuse of innovations in biomedicine and to protect human dignity. The Convention was opened for signature on 4 April 1997 in Oviedo, Spain and is thus otherwise known as the Oviedo Convention. The International treaty is a manifestation of the effort on the part of the Council of Europe to keep pace with developments in the field of biomedicine; it is notably the first multilateral binding instrument entirely devoted to biolaw. The Convention entered into force on 1 December 1999.

== Characteristics ==
The Convention provides a framework structure to preserve human dignity comprehensively across the field of bioethics. The instrument is shaped around the premise that there is a fundamental connection between human rights and biomedicine. A minimum common standard is created by the Convention and allows states to legislate for a greater degree of protection upon ratification (Article 27). In addition, judicial protection is conferred on the national courts. Therefore, there is no basis on which an individual can bring an action in relation to the Oviedo Convention alone. The Convention may only be referenced in conjunction with proceedings brought in respect of a violation of the European Convention on Human Rights. Absence of any provisions for a judicial procedure from the convention is considered to be a major weakness of the Oviedo Convention.

== History ==
The rate of advancement in biomedicine caused concern to the Council of Europe that as much as development in this field instilled hope for mankind, it also posed a threat. It became the objective of the Council of Europe to set out common general standards for the protection of the dignity of the human person in relation to biomedical sciences. A draft convention was requested by the Steering Committee on Bioethics (CDBI) and drafted by its Working Group in July 1992. The draft convention underwent public consultation in July 1994, adopted by the Committee of Ministers in November 1996, and finally opened for signature on 4 April 1997.

== Parties to the Convention ==
37 countries have signed the Oviedo Convention since it was opened for signature in 1997; however, only 29 of these countries have also ratified the convention. This means that only 29 countries have implemented the principles of the instrument into their national law. Furthermore, six of those ratifying countries have reservations limiting the extent to which they are bound to certain provisions. Notably, the UK and Germany have neither signed nor ratified the convention. The UK considered the convention too restrictive, whereas Germany thought it too permissive.

== Issues addressed by the Convention ==
The preamble to the Oviedo Convention makes clear that its intention is for developments in biomedicine to benefit future generations and all of humanity. The convention sets out the legal framework, which will ensure the protection of the dignity and identity of the human being. Intended as a supplementary instrument, the convention will be read in conjunction with other human rights protections namely: The Universal Declaration of Human Rights (UDHR), the International Covenant on Civil and Political Rights (ICCPR), the International Covenant on Economic, Social and Cultural Rights (ICESCR), the Convention on the Rights of the Child (CRC), the Convention for the Protection of Human Rights and Fundamental Freedoms (ECHR), the European Social Charter.

=== General principles ===
The general provisions of the Oviedo Convention outline the object and purpose of the instrument. The aim is to secure the dignity of human beings within the field of biomedicine. Several principles are adopted in order to achieve this goal. Embodied in the first chapter to the convention, the principles relate to the primacy of the human being, equitable access to healthcare (equitable access to healthcare), and professional standards.

=== Consent ===
The issue of consent is pivotal to the Convention because of the relationship it has to individual autonomy. Medical intervention carried out without consent is a general prohibition within Article 5. Furthermore, consent must be free and fully informed. Free and informed consent is based on objective information. Protection is afforded to those not able to consent and provision is made for emergency situations. Specific rules must be observed where any medical intervention is carried out in any situation where a person is not able to give free and informed consent.

=== Private life and right to information ===
This issue is closely related to the right to privacy in Article 8 of the European Convention on Human Rights. The scope of the right encompasses an individual’s entitlement not to know as well as the right to know information regarding their health. Interests of the patient, a third party, or society may lead to a restriction of either facet of the right.

=== Human genome ===
The Oviedo Convention incorporates provisions to address concerns relating to research into the human genome. Focus is honed on genetic testing, the storage of genetic data and modification of the human genome. Genetic testing as a tool for discrimination is prohibited under Article 11, while Article 12 allows genetic testing only for health or for scientific research linked to health purposes. The overarching theme is that genetic testing is reserved for health-related purposes only. Similarly, modification of the human genome, for reasons other than health-related is generally prohibited under Article 13 of the Convention.

=== Scientific research ===
The freedom of scientific research is embodied in Chapter V. However, precedence is afforded to the protection of human dignity and other fundamental freedoms. Therefore, the freedom of research is qualified (Article 15). Research carried out on human beings is under strict controls set forth by the convention (Article 16). The general rules on consent stipulated in Chapter II must be observed in the context of research. In addition, the creation of embryos in vitro for the purposes of scientific research is expressly prohibited (Article 18).

=== Organs and transplantation ===
The Convention provides the general rule that living donors for organ transplants are only to be utilised if there is no availability of organs from a deceased person. Any removed parts of the body must be disposed of respectfully in accordance with the wishes of the individual. In addition, there is to be no financial gain arising from the human body or its parts, however adequate compensation for expenses incurred for a medical procedure is not prohibited. The rules relating to consent laid out in Chapter II of the Convention also apply in the context of organ transplantation.

== Infringements of the Provisions of the Convention ==
In accordance with the European Convention on Human Rights, any individual who has suffered damage should have access to fair compensation (Article 24). Appropriate judicial protection is required to be put in place to ensure there is no infringement of the principles contained in the Convention. Proportionate sanctions will be imposed for non-compliance in accordance with Article 25.

== Wider protection ==
The Oviedo Convention reflects a minimum harmonisation instrument. Therefore, parties to the convention have jurisdiction to provide a greater degree of protection than that offered by the convention. However, they cannot offer lesser protection.

== Interpretation of the Convention ==
Questions of interpretation may be referred to the European Court of Human Rights for an advisory opinion to be issued. Individuals are unable to bring an action on the basis of violation of the Oviedo Convention alone, but may reference the provisions in proceedings relating to the European Convention on Human Rights.

== Reservations ==
A reservation may be made with respect to a particular provision of the convention (Article 36). Six states have reservations regarding particular provisions:

- Croatia
- Denmark
- France
- Norway
- Switzerland
- Turkey

== Denunciation ==
Any signatory can denounce the convention by means of notification to the Secretary General of the Council of Europe.

== Protocol on the Prohibition of Cloning Human Beings ==
Deliberate cloning, to create genetically identical human beings, is contrary to human dignity and constitutes a misuse of biology and medicine. It is therefore prohibited under this protocol.

== Protocol on Transplantation ==
The protocol stipulates that, insofar as is possible, equitable access to transplantation services should be ensured. In addition, any transplantation should be carried out with respect for rights and freedoms of donors, potential donors, and recipients of organs and tissues.

== Protocol on Biomedical Research ==
In the context of biomedical research, the protocol aims to ensure protection for dignity and identity of all human beings without discrimination. The Protocol recognises that research can contribute to saving and improving human life but it can also run contrary to the fundamental principles of dignity and other rights. Where this may be the case the research should not be carried out.

== Protocol on Genetic Testing for Health Purposes ==
The protocol responds to the concerns regarding possible improper use of genetic testing and aims to protect the dignity and identity of all human beings within this sphere. Through restricting use of genetic testing to health purposes only the convention aims to achieve its object and purpose. Genetic Testing is also permitted for scientific research, but its regulation is not included in this Protocol. It also establishes the need of free and informed consent and genetic counselling.
