= Deryck Beyleveld =

British legal scholar

Deryck Beyleveld is founding Director of the Sheffield Institute of Biotechnological Law and Ethics (SIBLE) and is now a member of Durham CELLS (Centre for Ethics and Law in the Life Sciences). He is Professor of Law and Bioethics, and a former Head of Law School at Durham University. He is on the editorial board of Medical Law International.

== Education ==
He was educated at the University of the Witwatersrand, Pembroke College, Cambridge, and completed his PhD at the University of East Anglia in 1975.

== Career ==
Professor Beyleveld is the leading exponent of the moral theory of the late Alan Gewirth and, as such, his work has attracted extensive academic support and criticism. Over a long career he has collaborated with many academics, principally Professor Roger Brownsword, King's College London and Professor Shaun Pattinson, Durham University.

== Bibliography ==
- Dialectical Necessity of Morality: An Analysis and Defense of Alan Gewirth's Argument to the Principle of Generic Consistency University of Chicago Press, 1991. ISBN 0-226-04482-3
- Human Dignity in Bioethics and Biolaw (with Roger Brownsword) Oxford University Press, 2002. ISBN 0-19-826826-2
- The Sole Fact of Pure Reason (with Marcus Düwell) De Gruyter, 2020. ISBN 9783110691252
