= Dignity =

Person's right to be valued, respected and treated ethically

Dignity is the right of a person to be valued and respected for their own sake, and to be treated ethically. In this context, it is of significance in morality, ethics, law and politics as an extension of the Enlightenment-era concepts of inherent, inalienable rights. The term may also be used to describe personal conduct, as in "behaving with dignity".

The content of contemporary dignity is derived from the Universal Declaration of Human Rights of 1948, summarized in the principle that every human being has the right to human dignity. In Article 1, it is stipulated that 'All human beings are born free and equal in dignity and rights. They are endowed with reason and conscience and should act towards one another in a spirit of brotherhood". References to human dignity became more common in constitutions and charters of human rights after World War II, in the aftermath of Nazi and fascist atrocities.

== Etymology ==
The English word "dignity", attested from the early 13th century, comes from Latin concept of dignitas, variously translated as "worthiness" or "prestige", by way of French dignité.

== Modern use ==
English-speakers often use the word "dignity" in proscriptive and cautionary ways: for example, in politics it can be used to critique the treatment of oppressed and vulnerable groups and peoples, but it has also been applied to cultures and sub-cultures, to religious beliefs and ideals, and even to animals used for food or research.

"Dignity" also has descriptive meanings pertaining to the worth of human beings. In general, the term has various functions and meanings depending on how the term is used and on the context.

In ordinary modern usage, the word denotes "respect" and "status", and it is often used to suggest that someone is not receiving a proper degree of respect, or even that they are failing to treat themselves with proper self-respect. There is also a long history of special philosophical use of this term. However, it is rarely defined outright in political, legal, and scientific discussions. International proclamations have thus far left dignity undefined, and scientific commentators, such as those arguing against genetic research and algeny, cite dignity as a reason but are ambiguous about its application.

Aurel Kolnai states:

Dignity also tends to connote the features of self-contained serenity, of a certain inward and toned-down but yet translucent and perceptible power of self-assertion: the dignified type of character is chary of emphatic activity rather than sullenly passive, perhaps impassive rather than impassible, patient rather than anxiously defensive, and devoid but not incapable of aggressiveness.

== Violations ==
=== Categories ===
Human dignity can be violated in multiple ways. The main categories of violations are:

Humiliation
Violations of human dignity in terms of humiliation refer to acts that humiliate or diminish the self-worth of a person or a group. Acts of humiliation are context dependent but we normally have an intuitive understanding where such a violation occurs. As Schachter noted, "it has been generally assumed that a violation of human dignity can be recognized even if the abstract term cannot be defined. 'I know it when I see it even if I cannot tell you what it is'". More generally, etymology of the word "humiliation" has a universal characteristic in the sense that in all languages the word involves "downward spatial orientation" in which "something or someone is pushed down and forcefully held there". This approach is common in judicial decisions where judges refer to violations of human dignity as injuries to people's self-worth or their self-esteem.
Instrumentalization or objectification
This aspect refers to treating a person as an instrument or as means to achieve some other goal. This approach builds on Immanuel Kant's moral imperative stipulating that we should treat people as ends or goals in themselves, namely as having ultimate moral worth which should not be instrumentalized.
Degradation
Violations of human dignity as degradation refer to acts that degrade the value of human beings. These are acts that, even if done by consent, convey a message that diminishes the importance or value of all human beings. They consist of practices and acts that modern society generally considers unacceptable for human beings, regardless of whether subjective humiliation is involved, such as selling oneself to slavery, or when a state authority deliberately puts prisoners in inhuman living conditions.
Dehumanization
These are acts that strip a person or a group of their human characteristics. It may involve describing or treating them as animals or as a lower type of human beings. This has occurred in genocides such as the Holocaust and in Rwanda where the minority were compared to insects.

=== Examples ===
Some of the practices that violate human dignity include torture, rape, social exclusion, labor exploitation, bonded labor, and slavery.

Both absolute and relative poverty are violations of human dignity, although they also have other significant dimensions, such as social injustice. Absolute poverty is associated with overt exploitation and connected to humiliation (for example, being forced to eat food from other people's garbage), but being dependent upon others to stay alive is a violation of dignity even in the absence of more direct violations. Relative poverty, on the other hand, is a violation because the cumulative experience of not being able to afford the same clothes, entertainment, social events, education, or other features of typical life in that society results in subtle humiliation; social rejection; marginalization; and consequently, a diminished self-respect.

Another example of violation of human dignity, especially for women in developing countries, is lack of sanitation. Having no access to toilets leaves currently about 1 billion people of the world with no choice other than to defecate in the open, which has been declared by the Deputy Secretary-General of the United Nations as an affront to personal dignity. Human dignity is also violated by the practice of employing people in India for "manual scavenging" of human excreta from unsanitary toilets – usually by people of a lower caste, and more often by women than men. Female genital mutilation (FGM) has been considered by Pope Francis I to be an example of a practice that violates human dignity.

The 1969 film The Magic Christian depicts a wealthy man (Peter Sellers) and his son (Ringo Starr) who test the limits of dignity by forcing people to perform self-degrading acts for money. The 2000 Simpsons episode "Homer vs. Dignity" has a similar plot.

== Philosophical history ==
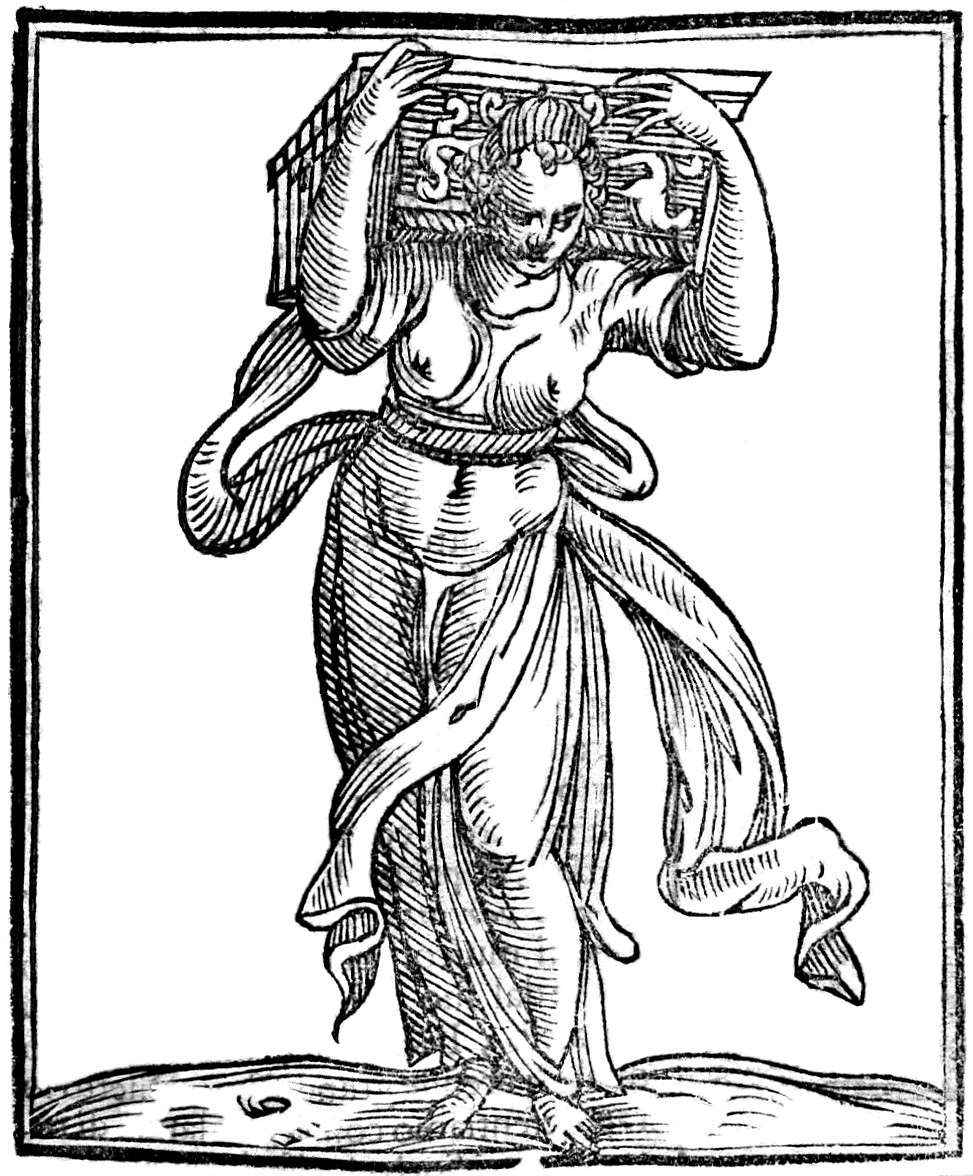
Woodcut from Cesare Ripa's Iconologia depicting the Allegory of Dignity

=== Pico della Mirandola ===
A philosopher of the Renaissance, Pico della Mirandola, granted dignity to ideas and to beings. In his "Oration on the Dignity of Man", he told hostile clerics about the dignity of the liberal arts and about the dignity and the glory of angels. His comments implied the dignity of philosophers. This oration is commonly seen as one of the central texts of the Renaissance, intimately tied with the growth of humanist philosophies.

=== Immanuel Kant ===
A philosopher of the Age of Enlightenment (18th century), Immanuel Kant held that there were things that should not be discussed in terms of value, and that these things could be said to have dignity. 'Value' is necessarily relative, because the value of something depends on a particular observer's judgment of that thing. Things that are not relative – that are "ends in themselves", in Kant's terminology – are by extension beyond all value, and a thing is an end in itself only if it has a moral dimension; if it represents a choice between right and wrong. In Kant's words: "Morality, and humanity as capable of it, is that which alone has dignity." Specifically with respect to human dignity, which his writings brought from relative obscurity in Western philosophy into a focal point for philosophers, Kant held that "free will" is essential; human dignity is related to human agency, the ability of humans to choose their own actions.

=== Mortimer Adler and Alan Gewirth ===
Philosophers of the late 20th century who have written significant works on the subject of dignity include Mortimer Adler and Alan Gewirth. Gewirth's views on human dignity are typically compared and contrasted with Kant's, for like Kant he theorizes that human dignity arises from agency. But while sharing Kant's view that rights arise from dignity, Gewirth focused far more than Kant on the positive obligations that dignity imposed on humans, the moral requirement not only to avoid harming but to actively assist one another in achieving and maintaining a state of "well-being".

Among other topics, including the dignity of labor, Adler extensively explored the question of human equality and equal right to dignity. According to Adler, the question of whether humans have equal right to dignity is intrinsically bound in the question of whether human beings are truly equal, which itself is bound in the question of whether human beings are a distinct class from all things, including animals, or vary from other things only by degree. Adler wrote that the only sense in which it is true that all human beings are equal is that they are equally distinct from animals. "The dignity of man," he said, "is the dignity of the human being as a person—a dignity that is not possessed by things." To Adler, failure to recognize the distinction challenged the right of humans to equal dignity and equal treatment.

=== Others ===
Dan Egonsson, followed by Roger Wertheimer, argued that while it is conventional for people to equate dignity with 'being human', people generally also import something other than mere humanness to their idea of dignity. Egonsson suggested that an entity must be both human and alive to merit an ascription of dignity, while Wertheimer states "it is not a definitional truth that human beings have human status."

According to Arthur Schopenhauer, dignity is opinion of others about our worth and subjective definition of dignity is our fear from this opinion of others.

Karl Marx's views on dignity were complex, and debates over the role of dignity in his thought relate to the question of whether Marx's critique of capitalism had a moral dimension. Marx wrote positively about dignity in his early work, and suggested it could underpin his theory of alienation; however he elsewhere rejected the view that humans have a right to dignity, and argued that moral norms could not form the basis of a critique of capitalism because they form part of society's ideological superstructure. The philosopher Somogy Varga argues that Marx's account of dignity forms part of a critique of Kantian ethics as unjustifiably imagining moral values to be transhistorical rather than emerging from historical processes and social practices.

More recently, Philippe-André Rodriguez has argued that human dignity is best understood as an essentially contested concept. As he argues, "it seems that it is this very nature of the concept that has allowed, on the one hand, human rights to receive such international acceptance as a theoretical enterprise and, on the other hand, has led the concept to be constantly challenged by different cultures worldwide."

== Religion ==
Human dignity is a central consideration of Christian philosophy. The Catechism of the Catholic Church states that the "dignity of the human person is rooted in his or her creation in the image and likeness of God". "All human beings", says the Church, "in as much as they are created in the image of God, have the dignity of a person." The catechism states that "the right to the exercise of freedom, especially in moral and religious matters, is an inalienable requirement of the dignity of the human person", and also links animal welfare to human dignity: "it is contrary to human dignity to cause animals to suffer or die needlessly". The Catholic Church proclaims the equal dignity of all people, regardless of their living conditions or qualities. Specifically, human dignity is intrinsic to human persons, and does not spring from agency or free will.

Human dignity, or kevod ha-beriyot, is also a central consideration of Judaism. Talmud cautions against giving charity publicly rather than in private to avoid offending the dignity of the recipient. Medieval Jewish philosopher Maimonides, in his codification of Halakha, cautioned judges to preserve the self-respect of people who came before them: "Let not human dignity be light in his eyes; for the respect due to man supersedes a negative rabbinical command".

An Islamic view of dignity is crystallized in the Quran through the selected biographies of Noah, Abraham, Joseph, David, Moses, Mary, Jesus, Muhammed, and others (differing from the narratives in the Bible, which the Quran claims were corrupted). Individuals such as these are presented as role-models of dignity because they did not abandon their self-respect by bowing to social pressures. When faced with the fear of disapproval, poverty, hunger, death etc. these individuals held firm in their sense of right and wrong, which was in-line with Divine ordinances. "The right course is that on which one keeps his attitudes, ambitions and requirements subjected to the Divine Laws; and in this way leads a balanced and graceful life. Such a person has grasped the most trustworthy support which will never fail him" (Quran 31:22). Such individuals are given the title of Muhsineen, who faced immense pressures but held firm in their positive actions. God awarded these individuals with authority and status in the land, and this reward is open to anyone who proves themselves worthy: "We bestow such honour and position on all those who lead their lives according to Our Laws." (Quran 37:80) Those who fall into this category are also afforded Divine protection from their mistakes: "Therefore We have saved you and your son from this. We have done so because We keep those who lead their lives according to Divine guidance safe from such mishaps." (37:104–105) The Quranic State that Muhammad began in Medinah sought to protect human dignity, since in a Quranic Welfare State individuals are free to work and live without the pressures faced by the threat of poverty, and thus can obey God's Laws as free individuals, contributing as part of a unified brotherhood working towards achieving humanity's full potential. Elaborations on dignity have been made by many scholars of Islam, such as Mohammad-Ali Taskhiri, head of the Islamic Culture and Communications Organization in Iran, in 1994. According to Taskhiri, dignity is a state to which all humans have equal potential, but which can only be actualized by living a life pleasing to the eyes of God. This is in keeping with the 1990 Cairo Declaration on Human Rights in Islam, which states that "True faith is the guarantee for enhancing such [basic human] dignity along the path to human perfection".

The Buddhist understanding of human dignity is rooted in the idea that people are able to choose the path of self-perfection. The state of self-perfection, a condition of fully developed courage, wisdom and compassion, is described as Buddhahood or enlightenment. The idea that all people—all life, in fact—have this potential is expressed by the concept, stressed particularly in the Mahayana tradition, that all living beings possess Buddha nature.

== United Nations Universal Declaration of Human Rights ==
1. All human beings are born free and equal in dignity and rights. They are endowed with reason and conscience and should act towards one another in a spirit of brotherhood.
2. Everyone is entitled to all the rights and freedoms set forth in this Declaration, without distinction of any kind, such as race, color, sex, language, religion, political or other opinion, national or social origin, property, birth or other status.

— Universal Declaration of Human Rights, Articles 1 and 2

== Medicine ==
In the 20th century, dignity became an issue for physicians and medical researchers. It has been invoked in questions of the bioethics of human genetic engineering, human cloning, and end-of-life care (particularly in such situations as the Terri Schiavo case, a controversial situation in which life support was withdrawn from a woman diagnosed in a persistent vegetative state).

=== International bodies ===
In June 1964, the World Medical Association issued the Declaration of Helsinki. The Declaration says at article 11, "It is the duty of physicians who participate in medical research to protect the life, health, dignity, integrity, right to self-determination, privacy, and confidentiality of personal information of research subjects."

The Council of Europe invoked dignity in its effort to govern the progress of biology and medicine. On 4 April 1997, the council, at Oviedo, approved the Convention for the Protection of Human Rights and Dignity of the Human Being with regard to the Application of Biology and Medicine. The convention's preamble contains these statements, among others:

Conscious of the accelerating developments in biology and medicine;

Convinced of the need to respect the human being both as an individual and as a member of the human species and recognising the importance of ensuring the dignity of the human being;

Conscious that the misuse of biology and medicine may lead to acts endangering human dignity;

Resolving to take such measures as are necessary to safeguard human dignity and the fundamental rights and freedoms of the individual with regard to the application of biology and medicine.

The Convention states, "Parties to this Convention shall protect the dignity and identity of all human beings and guarantee everyone, without discrimination, respect for their integrity and other rights and fundamental freedoms with regard to the application of biology and medicine."

In 1998, the United Nations mentioned dignity in the UNESCO Declaration on the Human Genome and Human Rights. At Article 2, the declaration states, "Everyone has a right to respect for their dignity." At Article 24, the declaration warns that treating a person to remove a genetic defect "could be contrary to human dignity." The Commentary that accompanies the declaration says that, as a consequence of the possibility of germ-line treatment, "it is the very dignity of the human race which is at stake."

=== Canada ===
In 1996, the Government of Canada issued a report entitled "New Reproductive and Genetic Technologies". The report used "the principles of respect for human life and dignity" as its reason for recommending that various activities associated with genetic research and human reproduction be prohibited. The report said the prohibited activities were "contrary to Canadian values of equality and respect for human life and dignity."

=== Denmark ===
The Ministry of Health enacted the Danish Council Act 1988, which established the Danish Council of Ethics. The Council advises the Ministry on matters of medicine and genetic research on humans. In 2001, the Council condemned "reproductive cloning because it would violate human dignity, because it could have adverse consequences for the cloned person and because permitting research on reproductive cloning would reflect a disregard for the respect due to the moral status of embryos."

=== France ===
In 1984, France set up the National Consultative Committee for Ethics in the Life and Health Sciences (CCNE) to advise the government about the regulation of medical practices and research. In 1986, the CCNE said, "Respect for human dignity must guide both the development of knowledge and the limits or rules to be observed by research." The CCNE said that research on human embryos must be subject to "the rule of reason" and must have regard for "undefined dignity in its practical consequences." The CCNE insisted that, in research on human embryos, the ethical principles that should apply are "respecting human dignity" and respecting "the dignity of science."

=== Portugal ===
The National Council of Ethics of Portugal published its Opinion on the Ethical Implications of Cloning in 1997. The opinion states, "the cloning of human beings, because of the problems it raises concerning the dignity of the human person, the equilibrium of the human species and life in society, is ethically unacceptable and must be prohibited."

=== Sweden ===
Sweden's The Genetic Integrity Act (2006:351), The Biobanks in Medical Care Act (2002:297), Health and Medical Services (Professional Activities) Act (1998:531), and The Health and Medical Services Act (1982:763) all express concern for "the integrity of the individual" or "human dignity."

=== United States ===
In 2008, The President's Council on Bioethics tried to arrive at a consensus about what dignity meant but failed. Edmund D. Pellegrino, M.D., the council's chairman, says in the Letter of Transmittal to the President of The United States, "… there is no universal agreement on the meaning of the term, human dignity."

== Law ==
McDougal, Lasswell, and Chen studied dignity as a basis for international law. They said that using dignity as the basis for laws was a "natural law approach." The natural law approach, they said, depends upon "exercises of faith." McDougal, Lasswell, and Chen observed:

The abiding difficulty with the natural law approach is that its assumptions, intellectual procedures, and modalities of justification can be employed equally by the proponents of human dignity and the proponents of human indignity in support of diametrically opposed empirical specifications of rights ...

=== Canada ===
In 2004, Canada enacted the Assisted Human Reproduction Act. Section 2(b) of the Act states, "the benefits of assisted human reproductive technologies and related research for individuals, for families and for society in general can be most effectively secured by taking appropriate measures for the protection and promotion of human health, safety, dignity and rights in the use of these technologies and in related research." The Act prescribes a fine not exceeding $500,000 or imprisonment for a term not exceeding ten years, or both, if someone undertakes a proscribed activity such as the creation of a chimera.

=== European Union ===
Article 1 of the Charter of Fundamental Rights of the European Union affirms the inviolability of human dignity.

=== France ===
In 1997, the National Consultative Committee for Ethics in the Life and Health Sciences, as well as other observers, noted that France's dignity-based laws on bio-medical research were paradoxical. The law prohibited the willful destruction of human embryos but directed that human embryos could be destroyed if they were more than five years old. The law prohibited research on human embryos created in France but permitted research on human embryos brought to France. The law prohibited researchers from creating embryos for research but allowed researchers to experiment with embryos that were superfluous after in vitro fertilization.

=== Germany ===
Human dignity is the fundamental principle of the German constitution. Article 1, paragraph 1 reads: "Human dignity shall be inviolable. To respect and protect it shall be the duty of all state authority." Human dignity is thus mentioned even before the right to life. This has a significant impact on German law-making and jurisdiction in both serious and trivial items:

- Human dignity is the basis of § 131 of the German criminal code, which prohibits the depiction of cruelty against humans in an approving way. § 131 has been used to confiscate horror movies and to ban video games like Manhunt and the Mortal Kombat series.
- A decision by the German Federal Constitutional Court in 1977 said life imprisonment without the possibility of parole is unconstitutional as a violation of human dignity (and the Rechtsstaat principle). Today, a prisoner serving a life term can be granted parole on good behavior as early as 15 years after being incarcerated, provided that his release is held to constitute little danger to the public. Persons deemed still dangerous can be incarcerated indefinitely on a life term, if this judgment is regularly reaffirmed.
- § 14(3) of the Luftsicherheitsgesetz, which would have allowed the Bundeswehr to shoot down airliners if they are used as weapons by terrorists, was declared unconstitutional mainly on the grounds of human dignity: killing a small number of innocent people to save a large number cannot be legalized since it treats dignity as if it were a measurable and limited quantity.
- A Benetton advertisement showing human buttocks with an "H.I.V. positive" stamp was declared a violation of human dignity by some courts, but in the end found legal.
- The first German law legalizing abortion in 1975 was declared unconstitutional because the court held that embryos had human dignity. A new law on abortion was developed in the 1990s. This law makes all abortions de jure illegal, except if preceded by counseling (§ 219(1) of the German criminal code).
- In a decision from 1981, the German Federal Administrative Court declared that peep shows violated the human dignity of the performer, regardless of their feelings. The decision was later revised. Peep shows where the performer cannot see the persons who are watching them remain prohibited as a matter of dignity.

=== India ===
The word 'dignity' is mentioned in the Preamble to the Constitution of India:

WE, THE PEOPLE OF INDIA, having solemnly resolved to constitute India into a SOVEREIGN SOCIALIST SECULAR DEMOCRATIC REPUBLIC and to secure to all its citizens

JUSTICE, social, economic and political; LIBERTY of thought, expression, belief, faith and worship; EQUALITY of status and of opportunity; and to promote among them all FRATERNITY assuring the dignity of the individual and the unity and integrity of the Nation;

IN OUR CONSTITUENT ASSEMBLY this 26th day of November 1949, do HEREBY ADOPT, ENACT AND GIVE TO OURSELVES THIS CONSTITUTION.

The preamble is widely regarded as the backbone of the Indian constitution, and is seen as embodying its spirit. There have been instances where in contentious situations like the passing of the Citizenship Amendment Act, 2019, criticisms have been made by recalling the constitutional Values of dignity and national integrity, as mentioned in the Preamble.

=== Iran ===
The need to respect human dignity has been written in the Iranian constitution law. Article 2 of the Iranian Constitution Law mentions six principles and infrastructures as basic to the governing system which in Article 1 is called the Islamic Republic of Iran. The sixth principle of this Article concerns human dignity and stipulates that "the Islamic Republic of Iran is a system founded on faith in ….6) Human dignity and high value and his/her freedom as well as his responsibility before God"[3]. Besides, in the prelude to the Constitution, human dignity is referred to concerning the mass media.

=== South Africa ===
The Constitution of South Africa lists "human dignity, the achievement of equality and the advancement of human rights and freedoms" as one of the founding values of the South African state, and the Bill of Rights is described as affirming the "democratic values of human dignity, equality and freedom". Section 10 of the Constitution explicitly states that "Everyone has inherent dignity and the right to have their dignity respected and protected." In jurisprudence, the right to dignity is often seen as underlying more specific rights, such as equality, security of the person or privacy, but it has been directly applied in a number of cases relating to criminal punishment, the law of defamation, and the right to marriage and family life.

=== Switzerland ===
The Swiss Federal Constitution provides in article 7 that "Human dignity must be respected and protected." It also provides, in art. 120, that the state must "take account of the dignity of living beings as well as the safety of human beings, animals and the environment" when legislating on the use of reproductive and genetic material; consequently the Federal Ethics Commission on Non-Human Biotechnology (ECNH) issued, in 2008, a publication entitled "The dignity of living beings with regard to plants".

== See also ==
- Admiration
- Anger
- Autonomy
- Beyond Freedom and Dignity
- Dignity of risk
- Dignity in dying
- Dignity taking
- Humanity (virtue)
- Human rights
- Identity performance
- Impression management
- Industriousness
- Justice
- Pride
- Pity
- Quality of life
- Respect
- Righteous indignation
- Self-concept
- Self-determination theory
- Self-esteem
- Self-respect
- Stigma management
