= Shaun Pattinson =

British legal scholar

Professor Shaun D. Pattinson FRSA FRSB
- Born: Shaun David Pattinson

Academic background
- Education: University of Hull, University of Sheffield

Academic work
- Discipline: Law
- Sub-discipline: Medical law Medical ethics
- Notable works: Medical Law and Ethics
- Website: https://www.durham.ac.uk/staff/s-d-pattinson

Shaun D. Pattinson is a British legal scholar specializing in medical law and medical ethics. He currently serves as a Professor of Medical Law and Ethics at Durham Law School, Durham University. In 2011, he founded the Centre for Ethics and Law in the Life Sciences (Durham CELLS) at Durham University.

== Education and career ==
Pattinson earned his undergraduate law degree from the University of Hull. He furthered his studies at the University of Sheffield, obtaining a master's degree and a Ph.D.

He received higher doctorates by the University of Sheffield (LLD) and Durham University. (DLitt).

Pattinson took up a Lectureship in Law at the University of Sheffield in 2000 and was promoted to Senior Lecturer in 2005. He was appointed as a Reader in Law at Durham University in 2006 and was promoted to Professor of Medical Law and Ethics in 2013.

== Professional roles and honours ==
Pattinson has held several notable positions:

- Guest Professor at Tongji University, since 2024.
- Member of the Council of Governors of South Tees Hospitals NHS Foundation Trust, since 2022.
- Member of the editorial board of The Biologist (the journal of Royal Society of Biology, since 2017.
- Deputy Chair of the Nuffield Council on Bioethics, where he also chaired the Horizon Scanning Advisory Group, until 2021.
- Editor of Medical Law International from 2005 to 2011.

His professional recognitions include being a Senior Fellow of the Advance HE (SFHEA), a Fellow of the Royal Society of Arts (FRSA) and a Fellow of the Royal Society of Biology (FRSB).

== Research and publications ==
Pattinson's research interests focus on medical law and medical ethics, including the regulation of emerging technologies. He has authored several books, including:

- Influencing Traits Before Birth (2002).
- Revisiting Landmark Cases in Medical Law (2018).
- Law at the Frontiers of Biomedicine (2023).
- Medical Law and Ethics (7th ed., 2025).

His book Medical Law and Ethics received the 2010 Minty Medico-Legal Society Prize for best medico-legal book.

He has also published with Deryck Beyleveld.

== Recent work ==
From 2014 to 2017, Pattinson led a project entitled ‘Human Cloning and Stem Cell Research Through the Medium of Law’, funded by the Wellcome Trust. This involved using law to engage post-16 students in the debate over human cloning, stem cell research and mitochondrial replacement technology. A finding was that UK school students had been misinformed as to how Dolly (sheep) had been cloned.

In January 2023, Pattinson published Law at the Frontiers of Biomedicine, presenting a legal theory termed 'contextual legal idealism'. This work explores the regulation of emerging biotechnologies, such as heritable genome editing and cryonic reanimation, and was supported by a Leverhulme Major Research Fellowship.
