= David Archard =

British moral philosopher

David Archard (born 19 January 1951) is a British moral philosopher who is Emeritus Professor of Philosophy at Queen's University Belfast. He is known for his work on children and families.

== Career ==
As an undergraduate, Archard studied philosophy at Corpus Christi, University of Oxford from 1969 to 1972, and then read for a PhD at the London School of Economics from 1972 to 1976. In 1976, he took up a lectureship at Ulster Polytechnic, later being promoted to senior Lecturer. In 1995, he moved to St. Andrews as a reader in moral philosophy, and, in 2003, became a professor of philosophy & public policy in 2003. He left Lancaster in 2018 and became a professor of philosophy at Queen's University Belfast. In 2018, he became emeritus professor.

From 2005 to 2016, he was a member of the board of the Human Fertilisation and Embryology Authority. He has been the chair of the Nuffield Council on Bioethics since 2017. Other roles Archard has undertaken over his career include editorial or management roles at the journals Res Publica, The Philosophical Quarterly, the Journal of Applied Philosophy, and Contemporary Political Theory, and at the scholarly organisations the British Philosophical Association, the Arts and Humanities Research Council, and the Society for Applied Philosophy.

== Selected publications ==
Books

- David Archard (1980). Marxism and Existentialism: The Political Philosophy of Jean-Paul Sartre and Maurice Merleau-Ponty. Belfast: Blackstaff Press. (Second edition 1992.)
- David Archard (1984). Consciousness and Unconscious. London: Hutchinson.
- David Archard (1993). Children: Rights and Childhood. London: Routledge. (Second edition 2004; third edition 2014.)
- David Archard (1998). Sexual Consent. Oxford: Westview Press.
- David Archard (2003). Children, Family, and the State. Aldershot: Ashgate.
- David Archard (2010). The Family: A Liberal Defence. Basingstoke: Palgrave Macmillan.

Edited collections

- David Archard, ed. (1996). Philosophy and Pluralism. Cambridge: Cambridge University Press.
- David Archard and Colin M. Macleod, eds. (2002). The Moral and Political Status of Children. Oxford: Oxford University Press.
- Paul Gifford, David Archard, Trevor A. Hart, and Nigel Rapport, eds. (2002). 2000 Years and Beyond: Faith, Identity and the Common Era. London: Routledge.
- David Archard and David Benatar, eds. (2010). Bearing and Rearing: The Ethics of Procreation and Parenthood. Oxford: Oxford University Press.
- David Archard, Monique Deveaux, Neil Manson, and Daniel Weinstock, eds. (2013). Reading Onora O'Neill. London: Routledge.
