= Luftsicherheitsgesetz =

2005 German law

The Luftsicherheitsgesetz (German for Aviation Security Act) is a German law created in response to the September 11 attacks which came into force on 15th January, 2005. § 14 (3) would have granted the Bundeswehr permission to use weapons against commercial airliners once their designation as a weapon by hijackers had become apparent. However, the clause was declared unconstitutional by the Federal Constitutional Court on 15 February 2006. The court affirmed that the sacrifice of innocent lives to the benefit of another group violated the unconditionally protected human dignity under Article 1 of the German constitution.

== See also ==
- de:Urteil des Bundesverfassungsgerichts zum Luftsicherheitsgesetz 2005
- Trolley problem
