= Nuffield Council on Bioethics =

UK bioethics organization

- Formation: 1991
- Founded: 1991; 35 years ago
- Purpose: To identify, examine and report on the ethical questions raised by advances in biological and medical research.
- Location: London, United Kingdom
- Chair: Sarah Cunningham-Burley
- Director: Danielle Hamm
- Parent organization: Nuffield Foundation
- Website: nuffieldbioethics.org

The Nuffield Council on Bioethics is a UK-based independent charitable body, which examines and reports on bioethical issues raised by new advances in biological and medical research. Established in 1991, the Council is funded by the Nuffield Foundation, the Medical Research Council and the Wellcome Trust. The Council has been described by the media as a 'leading ethics watchdog', which 'never shrinks from the unthinkable'.

== Purpose ==
The Nuffield Council on Bioethics was set up in response to concerns about the lack of a national organization responsible for evaluating the ethical implications of developments in biomedicine and biotechnology. Its terms of reference are:

- To identify and define ethical questions raised by recent developments in biological and medical research that concern, or are likely to concern, the public interest;
- To make arrangements for the independent examination of such questions with appropriate involvement of relevant participants;
- To inform and engage in policy and media debates about ethical questions and provide informed comment on emerging issues related to or derived from the Council’s published or ongoing work; and
- To make policy recommendations to Government or other relevant bodies and to disseminate its work through published reports, briefings and other appropriate outputs.

== How the Council works ==
The Council selects topics to examine through a horizon scanning programme, which aims to identify developments relevant to biological and medical research. Members of the Council meet quarterly to discuss and contribute to ongoing work, review recent advances in medical and biological research that raise ethical questions and choose topics for further exploration. The Council is well known for its in-depth inquiries which usually take 18–24 months and are overseen by an expert working group, informed by extensive consultation and research.

== Membership and governance ==
The Chair of the Nuffield Council on Bioethics is appointed by the Nuffield Foundation in consultation with the other funders. Chairs are appointed for five years. Council members are drawn from relevant fields of expertise including science, medicine, sociology, philosophy and law, for an initial period of three years, with the possibility of an additional three-year term. When vacancies arise, the council advertises widely. The council's membership advisory group considers and makes recommendations to the council on future members selected from the respondents to advertisements.

=== Governing board ===
The governing board was established by the funders of the council in 2017 and holds the principal responsibility for the governance of the NCOB, overseeing its operations and providing assurance that it is working within the terms of its grant. The chair (distinct from the chair of the council) is Professor Jane Macnaughton (Durham University) with other members Dr Sarion Bowers (University of Cambridge), Professor Adam Hedgecoe (Cardiff University), Dr Katherine Littler (World Health Organisation) and three representatives of the funders.

=== Chair ===
- Professor Sarah Cunningham-Burley (2024–present)
- Professor David Archard (2017–2024)
- Professor Jonathan Montgomery (2012–2017)
- Professor Albert Weale FBA (2008–2012)
- Professor Sir Bob Hepple QC FBA (2003–2007)
- Professor Sir Ian Kennedy FBA (1998–2002)
- Baroness Onora O'Neill CBE, FBA (1996–1998)
- Sir Patrick Nairne GCB, MC (1991–1996)

=== Director ===
Danielle Hamm was appointed in June 2021

Former Directors:

- Hugh Whittall
- Professor Sandy Thomas
- David Shapiro

=== Members ===
Current

- Victoria Butler-Cole
- Carol Brayne
- Melanie Challenger
- Clare Chambers
- John Coggon
- Frances Flinter
- Elaine Gadd
- Anne Kerr
- Michael Reiss
- Mehrunisha Suleman
- Susan Tansey

Previous members

- Simon Burrall
- Simon Caney
- Tara Clancy(2015-21)
- John Dupré
- Robin Weiss
- Adam Wishart
- Tom Shakespeare
- Mona Siddiqui
- Michael Banner (2014–16)
- Kenneth Calman (2000–08)
- John Gurdon (1991–95)
- Soren Holm (2006–12)
- John Krebs (2006–07)
- Ottoline Leyser (2009–15)
- Tim Lewens (2009–15)
- Anne McLaren (1991-00)
- Shaun Pattinson, former Deputy Chair (2015-21)
- Raymond Plant (2004–07)
- Pauline Perry (2003–05)
- Nick Ross (1999-05)
- Marilyn Strathern (2000–06)
- David Williams (1991–94)
- Margaret Turner-Warwick (1991-00)
- Christine Watson

== Publications ==
- Climate change and health: embedding ethics into policy and decision making (Jan 2025)
- Stem cell-based embryo models (November 2024)
- Predicting: The future of health (Sept 2024)
- Disagreements in the care of critically ill children (Sept 2023)
- The future of ageing: Ethical Considerations for research and innovation (April 2023)
- Genome editing and human reproduction: social and ethical issues (July 2018)
- Human embryo culture: Discussions concerning the statutory time limit for maintaining human embryos in culture in the light of some recent scientific developments (August 2017)
- Cosmetic procedures: ethical issues (June 2017)
- Non-invasive prenatal testing: ethical issues (March 2017)
- Genome editing: an ethical review (September 2016)
- (un)natural: Ideas about naturalness in public and political debates about science, technology and medicine (December 2015)
- Children and clinical research: ethical issues (May 2015)
- The collection, linking and use of data in biomedical research and healthcare: ethical issues (February 2015)
- The findings of a series of engagement activities exploring the culture of scientific research in the UK (December 2014)
- Novel neurotechnologies: intervening in the brain (June 2013)
- Donor conception: ethical aspects of information sharing (April 2013)
- Emerging biotechnologies: technology, choice and the public good (December 2012)
- Novel techniques for the prevention of mitochondrial DNA disorders: an ethical review (2012)
- Human bodies: donation for medicine and research (2011)
- Biofuels: ethical issues (2011)
- Medical profiling and online medicine: the ethics of 'personalised healthcare' in a consumer age (2010)
- Dementia: ethical issues (2009)
- Public health: ethical issues (2007)
- The forensic use of bioinformation: ethical issues (2007)
- Critical care decisions in fetal and neonatal medicine: ethical issues (2006)
- Genetic Screening: a Supplement to the 1993 Report by the Nuffield Council on Bioethics (2006)
- The ethics of research involving animals (2005)
- The ethics of research related to healthcare in developing countries: a follow-up Discussion Paper (2005)
- The use of genetically modified crops in developing countries: a follow-up Discussion Paper (2003)
- Pharmacogenetics: ethical issues (2003)
- Genetics and human behaviour: the ethical context (2002)
- The ethics of patenting DNA: a discussion paper (2002)
- The ethics of research related to healthcare in developing countries (2002)
- Stem cell therapy: the ethical issues – a discussion paper (2000)
- The ethics of clinical research in developing countries: a discussion paper (1999)
- Genetically modified crops: the ethical and social issues (1999)
- Mental disorders and genetics: the ethical context (1998)
- Animal-to-human transplants: the ethics of Xenotransplantation (1996)
- Human tissue: ethical and legal issues (1995)
- Genetic screening: ethical issues (1993)

== Influence ==
The Council's recommendations to policy makers have often been described as 'influential'.

== Funding ==
The Council was entirely funded by the Nuffield Foundation from 1991 to 1994. Since 1994, the Council has been jointly funded by the Nuffield Foundation, the Medical Research Council and The Wellcome Trust on a five-year rolling system. Towards the end of each five-year period, a process of external review is a condition of continued support. Funding has been confirmed until 2022 following the satisfactory completion of the latest funding bid.

== Ethical approach ==
The Council takes the view that its terms of reference do not require it to adopt the same ethical framework or set of principles in all reports. The Council is therefore not bound by the values of particular schools of philosophy (for example, utilitarianism, deontology, virtue ethics) or approaches in bioethics, such as the 'four principles of bioethics' (autonomy, justice, beneficence, non-maleficence), or the Barcelona Principles (autonomy, dignity, integrity, vulnerability).

In 2006-7, John Harris, Professor of Bioethics at the University of Manchester, and Dr Sarah Chan carried out an external review of the way ethical frameworks, principles, norms and guiding concepts feature in the Council's publications. The authors found that the ethical frameworks used in the Council's publications had become increasingly explicit and transparent.
