= Alan Gewirth =

American philosopher (1912–2004)

- Born: November 28, 1912; West New York, New Jersey
- Died: May 9, 2004 (aged 91); Chicago, Illinois

Academic background
- Education: Columbia University (BA, PhD)

Academic work
- Discipline: Moral philosophy and political philosophy
- Institutions: University of Chicago
- Notable students: Roger Pilon
- Notable works: Reason and Morality

Alan Gewirth (November 28, 1912 – May 9, 2004) was an American philosopher, a professor of philosophy at the University of Chicago, and author of Reason and Morality (1978), Human Rights: Essays on Justification and Applications (1982), The Community of Rights (1996), Self-Fulfillment (1998), and numerous other writings in moral philosophy and political philosophy.

== Early life and education ==
Born in Manhattan and raised in West New York, New Jersey, Gewirth graduated from Memorial High School in January 1930 as valedictorian of his class. He graduated from Columbia University in 1934 and was inspired by Richard McKeon to become a philosopher. He spent 1936-37 at Cornell University and then studied at the University of Chicago. In 1942 he was drafted into the army. After the war, he spent 1946-1947 at Columbia University and received his PhD in philosophy in 1948. From 1947 onwards, he taught at the University of Chicago.

== Ethical theory ==
Gewirth is best known for his ethical rationalism, according to which a supreme moral principle, the "Principle of Generic Consistency" (PGC), is derivable as a requirement of "agential self-understanding". The principle states that every agent must act in accordance with his or her own and all other agents' generic rights.

According to Gewirth's theory, the PGC is derivable from the fact of human agency, but it is derivable only via a "dialectically necessary" mode of argumentation. The mode is "dialectical" in the sense that it presents the steps of the argument to the PGC as inferences made by an agent, rather than as statements true of the world itself. Each step is thus a description of what the agent thinks (or implicitly asserts), not of what things are like independently of the viewpoint of the agent. This mode of argumentation is also "necessary" both in the sense that its initial premise is inescapable from any agent's standpoint and in the sense that the subsequent steps of the proof are logically deduced from this premise.

Gewirth thus holds that any agent must accept the PGC as the principle of human rights on pain of self-contradiction, because the principle is contained as the inescapable conclusion of any agent's dialectically necessary characterization of his or her own activity. The initial premise, which we all must accept insofar as we perform any actions, is simply "I do X for purpose E". All agents implicitly accept this assertion insofar as they perform any voluntary actions; they therefore must accept it on pain of contradicting the assumption that they are agents. From there, Gewirth holds that an agent must attach a positive value to E, through some criterion that motivates them to achieve E, or else there would be no motivation to act in the first place. Because an agent values E, it follows that they must value the conditions necessary to achieve E. Gewirth claims that these conditions are those of freedom, which is the ability to choose purposes, and well-being, which is the ability to realize purposes. Since an agent must value their freedom and well-being, it follows that agents have a claim right to their freedom and well-being, for it is mutually exclusive to hold both that they must have freedom and well-being and that they may not have freedom and well-being. Given that each agent has a claim right to freedom and well-being, and that agents accept parallel reasoning, agents must accept that other agents also have those rights. Therefore, agents must respect the freedom and well-being of their recipients as well as of themselves, since both groups have the generic rights.

While Gewirth admits that his argument establishes the PGC only dialectically, he nevertheless claims that the principle is established as necessary, since any and all agents must accept it on pain of contradiction, and further argues that it is not necessary to establish a moral principle assertorically.

In 1991, the philosopher Deryck Beyleveld published The Dialectical Necessity of Morality, an authoritative reformulation of Gewirth's argument, including a summary of previously published objections and Beyleveld's own rigorous responses to them on Gewirth's behalf. There is no clear consensus among philosophers regarding the soundness of Gewirth's theory. For at least the past 30 years, philosophers have offered numerous objections to the theory but have nearly all been substantively countered by Gewirth and his adherents. The debate over Gewirth's ideas thus continues. In 2016 Routledge published a volume on Gewirth's ethical theory, edited by Swedish philosopher Per Bauhn and containing contributions by fifteen international scholars.

Gewirth's argument bears a (superficial) resemblance to the discourse ethics type theories of Jürgen Habermas, Karl-Otto Apel, and others. His student Roger Pilon has developed a libertarian version of Gewirth's theory, as has Hans Hermann Hoppe.

== Bibliography ==
- Reason and Morality. Chicago: The University of Chicago Press, 1978.
- Human Rights: Essays on Justification and Applications. Chicago: The University of Chicago Press, 1982.
- The Community of Rights. Chicago: The University of Chicago Press, 1996.
- Self-Fulfillment. Princeton: Princeton University Press, 1998.

== See also ==
- American philosophy
- List of American philosophers
