= Medical Law International =

- Discipline: Medical law
- Language: English
- Edited by: Isra Black, Sarah Devaney, Alexandra Mullock, Elizabeth Chloe Romanis

Publication details
- History: 1993-present
- Publisher: SAGE Publications
- Frequency: Quarterly

Standard abbreviations
- ISO 4: Med. Law Int.

Indexing
- CODEN: MLINFN
- ISSN: 0968-5332 (print); 2047-9441 (web)
- LCCN: sn94038297
- OCLC no.: 30062912

Links
- Journal homepage; Online access; Online archive

Medical Law International is a peer-reviewed law review that covers issues in medical law, bioethics, and health governance. It was established in 1993 and is currently published by SAGE Publications. The journal was established by Dianne Longley and Vivienne Harpwood and was edited by Shaun Pattinson from 2005 to 2011. Since 2025, it has been edited by Isra Black, Sarah Devaney, Alexandra Mullock and Elizabeth Chloe Romanis.
