= Per Bauhn =

Swedish philosopher

Per Roald Bauhn (born 1960) is a Swedish philosopher. Since 2004 he has been a professor of practical philosophy, first at Kalmar University College and, from 2010, at Linnaeus University. His main research interests include ethics and political philosophy, but also aesthetics.

== Writings ==
Bauhn has authored books on topics as diverse as nationalism, political terrorism, the virtue of courage, the duty to rescue, and the right to beauty. His philosophical work is inspired by the agency-based ethical theory of Alan Gewirth, according to which every agent must claim and recognize human rights to freedom and well-being, these being the generally necessary conditions of successful action.

=== Selected writings ===
- (1989) Ethical Aspects of Political Terrorism : The Sacrificing of the Innocent, Lund: Lund University Press (ISBN 91-7966-064-9); Bromley: Chartwell-Bratt (ISBN 0-86238-207-6).
- (1995) Nationalism and Morality, Lund: Lund University Press (ISBN 91-7966-317-6); Bromley: Chartwell-Bratt (ISBN 0-86238-392-7).
- (1995) Multiculturalism and Nationhood in Canada : The Cases of First Nations and Quebec (co-authors: Christer Lindberg & Svante Lundberg), Lund: Lund University Press (ISBN 91-7966-342-7); Bromley: Chartwell-Bratt (ISBN 0-86238-411-7).
- (1998) "Universal Rights and the Historical Context", European Journal of Development Research. 10:2. 19–32.
- (2003) The Value of Courage, Lund: Nordic Academic Press, ISBN 91-89116-62-3 (hardback).
- (2009) "Aesthetic Identity, Well-Being, and the Right to Beauty", The International Journal of the Arts in Society. 4:1. 71–80.
- (2011) "The Extension and Limits of the Duty to Rescue", Public Reason. 3:1. 39–49.
- (2013) "The Duty to Rescue and the Duty to Aid the Starving", International Dialogue: A Multidisciplinary Journal of World Affairs. 3. 4-37.
- (2014) "Art, Magic, and Agency", The International Journal of Arts Theory and History. 9:1. 1–10.
- (2016) Gewirthian Perspectives on Human Rights (ed.), Abingdon: Routledge, ISBN 9781138649866.
- (2017) Normative Identity, London and New York: Rowman & Littlefield, ISBN 9781783485765.
- (2023) Animal Suffering, Human Rights, and the Virtue of Justice, Cham: Palgrave Macmillan, ISBN 978-3-031-27048-2.
