= Sami Abu Zuhri =

Palestinian politician

- سامي أبو زُهْري

Senior spokesman

Personal details
- Born: 1967 (age 58–59) Rafah, Gaza Strip
- Party: Hamas

Sami Abu Zuhri (سامي أبو زُهْري; born 1967) is a senior spokesman for the Palestinian organization Hamas.

== Life ==
Abu Zuhri was born in Rafah in 1967. He studied history at the Islamic University of Gaza and served as head of the Islamic University Student Council from 1994 to 1997. He got his MA in history in 2004.

=== Career in Hamas ===
In May 2006, while travelling from Egypt to the Gaza Strip, Palestinian security and customs officials at the Rafah Border Crossing discovered 640,000 euros on his person (equivalent to $USD800,000), which had not been declared and was in excess of the $USD2,000 permitted. The money was confiscated from Abu Zuhri, who was returning from Qatar after he dropped a concealed money belt containing what was described by Reuters as "donations from Arab nations to the Palestinian government and it was meant to pay for prisoners in Israeli jails". Abu Zuhri was allowed to enter Gaza without the money, which was handed over to the Ministry of Interior. President Mahmoud Abbas requested an investigation into the incident.

Abu Zuhri stated his objection to the inclusion of what he referred to as the "so-called Holocaust" in the proposed UNRWA lesson plan for students in Gaza. He continued "we think it's more important to teach Palestinians the crimes of the Israeli occupation."

When Marwan Qawasmahi and Amer Abu Aisha, the suspected perpetrators of the kidnapping and murder of three Israeli teenagers in 2014, were killed by Israel, he said "Hamas praises the role the martyrs played in chasing down Israeli settlers and we stress that their assassination will not weaken the resistance".

In December 2014, Abu Zuhri reportedly harassed a Gaza-based foreign female reporter and was being investigated by Hamas.
