= Sarah Cunningham-Burley =

Sociology professor at the University of Edinburgh

Professor Sarah Cunningham-Burley
- Occupations: Professor of Medical and Family Sociology

Academic work
- Discipline: Sociology
- Sub-discipline: Health Qualitative Research Public Engagement Qualitative Analysis Families and Relationships
- Institutions: University of Edinburgh

Sarah Jane Cunningham-Burley FRSE FAcSS is a professor of Medical and Family Sociology in the Usher Institute at the University of Edinburgh.

== Research and career ==
Cunningham-Burley's research spans medical and family sociology. She is the co-director of the Centre for Research on Families and Relationships, and the Dean of Molecular, Genetic and Population Health Sciences at the University of Edinburgh.

Cunningham-Burley is a member of the Human Genetics Commission, an advisory body to the UK Government on new developments in human genetics, and she represents the Human Genetics Commission on the National DNA Database Strategy Board.

Cunningham-Burley co-founded the academic journal Families in Society by Bristol University Press.

The University of Edinburgh commissioned her portrait in 1998 which remains as part of the collection in the National Galleries of Scotland.

== Awards ==
Cunningham-Burley is the joint current holder of the Wellcome Trust Senior Investigator Award in Society and Ethics alongside Anne Kerr from the University of Leeds and a fellow of the Royal Society of Edinburgh.
