= Biolaw =

Intersection of law and the biosciences

Biolaw is an area of law that addresses the intersection of law and the biosciences. Biolaw addresses topics from CRISPR to genetic engineering to the patenting of new forms of life to de-extinction law. The Association of American Law Schools has had a chartered section on biolaw since 2010.

The field of biolaw has been of growing importance in the last several years with the rise of legal issues such as those surrounding biohacking, reproduction, surrogacy, and de-extinction.

== Academic Venues ==
The field of biolaw has several academic venues associated with it. Two conferences were held in the Fall of 2007: one was hosted by Jim Chen at Brandeis Law School (“Law and the Biosciences”) and another by Professor Andrew W. Torrance at the University of Kansas School of Law (the “Biolaw Conference”). Torrance then hosted the Biolaw Conference annually until 2011. Professor Hank Greely, who was an invited speaker at the first Biolaw Conference, Torrance, and Professors I. Glenn Cohen and Nita Farahany then cofounded the annual Bio Lawlapalooza, holding it first in the Spring of 2017, and annually after that, though the 2020 and 2021 meetings were canceled due to the Covid-19 pandemic.
