= Center for the Study of Bioethics =

Bioethics research institute in Belgrade, Serbia

The Center for the Study of Bioethics (CSB) is a bioethics research institute based in Belgrade, Serbia. It was founded in 2012 by the Serbian American philosopher Vojin Rakić. CSB is a scientific institution which cooperates closely with the University of Belgrade, maintaining at the same time a strong international focus. In 2015 UNESCO named CSB director, Vojin Rakić, Head of the European Division of the UNESCO Chair in Bioethics, thus making CSB the seat of this division. The Cambridge Working Group for Bioethics Education in Serbia was also constituted at the Center for the Study of Bioethics.

== Associates ==
CSB has Regular and Associate Members. The Center collaborates intensely with its Associate Members, for example through co-authorships of articles or debates conducted in international scientific journals. Among the Associate members of CSB are some of the world's most prominent bioethicists and philosophers: Peter Singer, John Harris, Arthur Caplan, Nicholas Agar, Ingmar Persson, Erik Parens, Anders Sandberg, Robert Sparrow, Tom Douglas, Thomasine Kushner, James Hughes, Don Marquis, Katrien Devolder, Bert Gordijn, Maartje Schermer. Members of the CSB Advisory Board include: Mildred Z. Solomon, President of the Hastings Center; Vladimir Bumbaširević, Rector of the University of Belgrade; Graham Avery, Honorary Director-General of the European Commission and Senior Member of St. Antony's College, Oxford University; Amnon Carmi, UNESCO Chair in Bioethics.

== Weekly Seminars ==
During the previous years CSB has organized a series of weekly seminars, entitled “Thursdays at Noon”. These seminars have so far featured dozens of both local and international scientists. Themes covered in the seminars span across various areas in bioethics.

== International Conferences ==
In May 2013 CSB organized, in cooperation with the Oxford Centre for Neuroethics, the conference “Enhancement: Cognitive, Moral and Mood”. The speakers included John Harris, Julian Savulescu and Peter Singer. This debate was continued, or rather taken to a new level in October 2015 with the conference “Enhancing Understanding of Enhancement“, organized by CSB and the Hastings Center, with John Harris and Erik Parens as keynote speakers. Both events took place in Belgrade, Serbia. In 2016 CSB organized, together with the Faculty of Philosophy of the University of Belgrade, the conference “Philosophy of Scientific Experimentation“, and in collaboration with the Faculty of Philosophy of the University of Rijeka, it organized the international symposium “Enhancements in biomedicine and freedom“. On 16–19 August 2017, CSB organized, in cooperation with the European Society for the Philosophy of Medicine and Health Care, the 31st ESPMH Annual Meeting "New Technologies in Health Care". On 20–21 August 2017, CSB partnered with the Division of Medical Ethics in NYU School of Medicine´s Department of Population Health and The Hastings Center, in order to organize the international conference “Genome editing: biomedical and ethical perspectives”. This event gathered an international group of ethics experts in order to discuss genome editing in humans and other living beings. The conference keynote speech included one that was delivered by Arthur Caplan. The conference was opened by the Serbian Prime Minister Ana Brnabic. All these events were realized in Belgrade. CSB currently organizes in Paris the conference "Existential Threats and Other Disasters: Novel (Bio)ethical Solutions for Novel Challenges", in partnership with The Hastings Center for Bioethics, Columbia University and the Chinese University of Hong Kong.

== Projects ==
CSB partakes in various projects whose aim is to raise public awareness of a wide spectrum of bioethical issues. Examples include the social inclusion of people suffering from rare diseases, disaster bioethics and genetic counseling. CSB's interest in the two latter problems is evident through its engagement in two EU projects: one dealing with disaster bioethics and the other encompassing, among various other issues, genetic counseling. CSB is an active participant of the subproject “Bioethical aspects: morally acceptable within the biotechnologically and socially possible”, which is part of a wider research project “Rare diseases: molecular pathophysiology, diagnostic and therapeutic modalities, and social, ethical, and legal aspects” funded by the Serbian Ministry of Education, Science and Technological Development. On 18 February 2016 CSB began implementing its new project “Help us“ which focuses on rare diseases. The project is supported by a consortium of international local organizations and does not have a fixed duration. One of the outcomes of the project is the web portal on rare diseases, Era of life. In 2016 CSB also launched a project of bioethics education for journalists. A number of "Continuing Medical Education" courses were also accredited and realized. 2016 also saw the continuation of the project “Bioethics in the classroom”, which first took place in the academic year 2014/2015. Since its inception one of CSB's main aims has been to bring bioethics closer to the wider public in Serbia. Before its foundation bioethical themes barely had any coverage in the country, while the activities of the Center have made it much more prominent in the media. Only in 2016 the center was featured in mass media outlets several hundreds of times. This trend continued in 2017.

== Possible reasons for the rise of CSB ==
Apart from the international accomplishments of some of its most prominent researchers, as well as intense cross-border cooperation within UNESCO and Cambridge University, CSB owes its results partly to: - The research institutions it collaborates with: An important role in the center's work is played by cooperating institutions: Oxford University, The Hastings Center, New York University, University of Belgrade, The Center for the Promotion of Science, the Institute of Social Sciences, the Faculty of Philosophy of the University of Belgrade. - Its numerous representative offices: CSB has founded numerous representative offices all over the world, at clinics and universities, as well as in the United Nations. - A large number of student interns: Every year a large number of students applies for an internship at CSB. Interns include both undergraduate and graduate students. They are assigned with activities such as organizing seminars and debates, or translating articles. The center's associates organize lectures through which the interns, as well as other interested students, can become acquainted with key bioethical issues. In this way CSB seeks to develop an interest in bioethical issues also among the youngest members of the research community. Their work in the Center enables the interns to gain experience, adopt basic research methodologies and enrich their theoretical and practical knowledge.
