= Vojin Rakić =

Serbian political scientist and philosopher

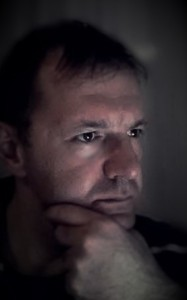
- Rakic in 2016
- Born: 1 February 1967; Belgrade, Yugoslavia

Philosophical work
- Era: Contemporary philosophy
- Region: Western philosophy
- School: Analytic philosophy
- Main interests: Ethics · Bioethics · Political philosophy
- Notable ideas: Human enhancement · Voluntary moral bioenhancement · Interpretation of moral foundations of Kantian cosmopolitanism

Vojin B. Rakic (born 1 February 1967) is a Serbian philosopher and political scientist. He publishes in English, but also in Serbian. He has a PhD in political science from Rutgers University in the United States. He has published on ethics, bioethics (human enhancement in particular), Kant, and cosmopolitan justice.

== Justice and Kant ==
Rakić is the author of a variety of books and articles from the domain of philosophy and political science. They include How to Enhance Morality, The Ultimate Enhancement of Morality, A Theory of the Normative Will, History and Future of Justice and Hegemony, Culture and Human Resources in Politics. In History and Future of Justice Rakić analyzes the teleological thesis that history in the long run is marked by a gradual development of morality and justice, and that humanity will achieve a condition of "perfect justice" at the end of its historical development– provided that history will last sufficiently long. A topical book influenced by History and Future of Justice is The Evolution of God, published in 2009 by Robert Wright.

In a number of his writings Rakić shows that the essence of Kant's understanding of the concept of justice in international relations is to be found in Religion within the Bounds of Bare Reason, a book that has mostly escaped the attention of scholars dealing with this aspect of Kant's thought.

== New ethical theory ==
In his latest books, both published by Springer in 2021 (How to Enhance Morality and The Ultimate Enhancement of Morality) Rakić reviews existing (bio)ethical theories and proposes an original ethical theory (the theory of "Ultimate Morality"), showing the superiority of this theory and asserting that this will become the dominant ethical theory of our time.

== Bioethics ==
During the previous years Rakić has been devoted to bioethics, developing the concept of voluntary moral bioenhancement, a recent field of interest of scientists dealing with human enhancement. Rakić favors moral enhancement, even with the help of medicines and other substances (e.g., oxytocin, some SSRIs, dopamine, propranolol), but only under the condition that their use is voluntary. Rakić has polemicized on the one hand with John Harris (who believes that cognitive bio-enhancement is sufficient for our moral improvement) and, on the other hand, with Julian Savulescu and Ingmar Persson (who used to defend the idea of making moral bio-enhancement compulsory). These two authors and Rakić have polemicized with each other during 2013 in the Journal of Medical Ethics. Rakić opened the debate in February 2013 and Persson and Savulescu responded in March. During 2014 Rakić, Robert Sparrow and Harris Wiseman polemicized in the American Journal of Bioethics on the same problem, as well as on other issues related to enhancement.

In 2012, Rakić founded the Center for the Study of Bioethics, a research institute based in Belgrade, Serbia. CSB has internal and associate members. They include Peter Singer, John Harris, Don Marquis, Nicholas Agar, Ingmar Persson, James J. Hughes and Stefan Lorenz Sorgner. In May 2013 CSB attracted widespread attention by organizing a conference in Belgrade at which John Harris and Julian Savulescu confronted their differing positions on human enhancement and freedom. Their debate continued for several days in Belgrade, not only at the conference (with Peter Singer as a discussant of their positions), but also in front of TV cameras. The Oxford Centre for Neuroethics co-organized the congress.

In October 2015, CSB organized another highly acclaimed bioethics conference in Belgrade, this time in collaboration with The Hastings Center. The keynote speakers were John Harris and Erik Parens. Reports on the event have appeared in dozens of media.

On 16–19 August 2017, CSB organized, in cooperation with the European Society for the Philosophy of Medicine and Health Care, the 31st ESPMH Annual Meeting "New Technologies in Health Care".

On 20–21 August 2017, CSB partnered with the Division of Medical Ethics in NYU School of Medicine's Department of Population Health and The Hastings Center, in order to organize the international conference "Genome editing: biomedical and ethical perspectives". This event gathered an international group of ethics experts in order to discuss genome editing in humans and other living beings. The conference keynote speech included one that was delivered by Arthur Caplan. The conference was opened by the Serbian Prime Minister Ana Brnabic.

Rakić is also a research professor at the Institute for Social Sciences, Head of the European Division of the UNESCO Chair in Bioethics, Head of the Serbian Unit of the UNESCO Chair in Bioethics and Chair of the Cambridge Working Group for Bioethics Education in Serbia.

== Social role ==
Rakić's role has not been limited to science and academia. In 2002, he became a special adviser of the United Nations to the Government of Serbia. During his work as a government adviser Rakic worked closely with Serbian Prime Minister Zoran Djindjic, who was assassinated in 2003 by rogue elements of the Serbian secret police that were still loyal to ousted President Slobodan Milosevic.

Before his commitments in the United Nations and the Government of Serbia, Rakić was a senior research fellow at the Center for Higher Education Policy Studies (CHEPS) of Twente University in the Netherlands.

Vojin Rakić spent much of his life in the Netherlands, the United States, the Czech Republic and Italy. Currently he is a university professor in Belgrade.

From the beginning of 2020, he criticized the President and Government of Serbia for adopting autocratic policies under the pretext of anti-COVID-19 measures, for counterfeiting data about the number of deceased COVID-19 patients, and for organizing undemocratic and unfair elections that were boycotted by the opposition. This resulted in a smear campaign against Rakić by Government controlled media in Serbia (primarily tabloids), as well as by Aleksandar Vučić, the president of Serbia, personally. This smear campaign came abruptly to an end as dozens of the world's most famous philosophers, ethicists and scientists (including Peter Singer, Arthur Caplan, John Harris, and Julian Savulescu) signed a letter of support for Vojin Rakić that they sent to the political leaders in the United States and in the European Union and in which they asked them to nudge Vučić into stopping his smear campaign and to publicly apologize to Rakić.

In October 2020, Rakić founded "New 6 October", an association aimed at the promotion of liberal democratic values in Serbia.

== Selected books ==
- Rakić, V.(2021), How To Enhance Morality. Dordrecht, NL: Springer.
- Rakić, V. (2021). The Ultimate Enhancement of Morality. Dordrecht, NL: Springer
- Rakić, V. (2019). Genome Editing: Biomedical and Ethical Perspectives. 2019. Guest editor (with Arthur Caplan) of the Special Issue of the Cambridge Quarterly of Health Care Ethics: 28(1).
- Rakić, V. (2013). Semantics of Statebulding: Language, Meanings and Sovereignty (co-editor with Nicolas Lemay-Hebert and Nicholas Greenwood Onuf and Petar Bojanić). London: Routledge.
- Rakić, V. (2010). A Theory of the Normative Will. Belgrade: Faculty of Economics and Political Science.
- Rakić, V. (2004). History and Future of Justice. Belgrade: Faculty of Organizational Sciences and VVMZ.
- Rakić, V. (2003). Hegemony, Culture and Human Resources in Politics. Belgrade: United Nations Development Program and the Faculty of Organizational Sciences.
- Rakić, V. (2006). Liberalizovanje Srbije: Politička elita koje nema i socijalna psihologija autodestrukcije. Beograd: Centar za razvoj liberalizma i Fakultet za menadžment.
- Rakić, V. (2004). Kraj istorije i liberalizacija srpske ideje. Beograd: Fakultet za menadžment.
