= The Future of Work and Death =

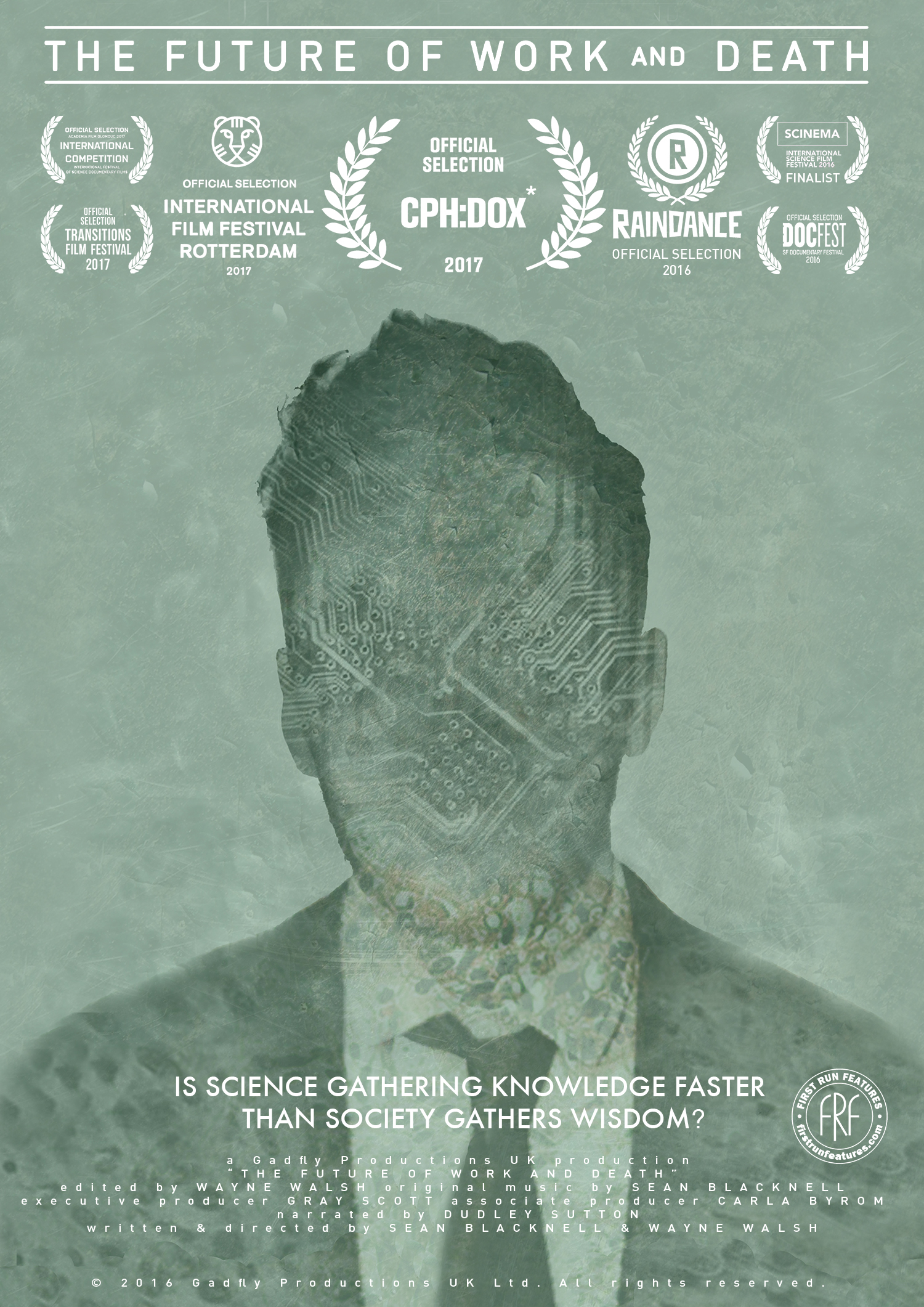
- Poster
- Directed by: Sean Blacknell & Wayne Walsh
- Written by: Sean Blacknell & Wayne Walsh
- Produced by: Sean Blacknell & Wayne Walsh
- Narrated by: Dudley Sutton
- Edited by: Wayne Walsh
- Music by: Sean Blacknell
- Production company: Gadfly Productions
- Distributed by: First Run Features Journeyman Pictures
- Release date: 25 September 2016 (Raindance Film Festival)
- Running time: 88 mins
- Country: UK
- Language: English

The Future of Work and Death is a 2016 documentary by Sean Blacknell and Wayne Walsh about the exponential growth of technology.

The film showed at several film festivals including Raindance Film Festival, International Film Festival Rotterdam, Academia Film Olomouc and CPH:DOX.

In May 2017 it received an official screening at the European Commission. It was distributed by First Run Features and Journeyman Pictures and was released on iTunes, Amazon Prime and On-demand on 9 May 2017. The film was made available on Sundance Now on 27 November 2017. A companion piece to the film, The Cost of Living, a documentary concerning universal basic income in Britain, was released on Amazon Prime on 8 October 2020.

== Synopsis ==
World experts in the fields of futurology, anthropology, neuroscience, and philosophy consider the impact of technological advances on the two 'certainties' of human life; work and death. Charting human developments from Homo habilis, past the Industrial Revolution, to the digital age and beyond, the film looks at the shocking exponential rate at which mankind has managed to create technologies to ease the process of living.

As we embark on the next phase of our adaptation, with automation and artificial intelligence signifying the complete move from man to machine, the film asks what the implications are for human fulfilment in an approaching era of job obsolescence and extreme longevity.

== Cast ==
- Dudley Sutton – Narrator
- Aubrey de Grey – Biomedical gerontologist and CSO of the SENS Research Foundation
- Will Self – Writer, journalist, political commentator and Professor of Contemporary Thought at Brunel University
- Rudolph E. Tanzi – Professor of Neurology at Harvard University and Director of the Genetics and Aging Research Unit at Massachusetts General Hospital (MGH)
- Martin Ford – Futurist and author
- Steve Fuller – Auguste Comte Chair in Social Epistemology at the Department of sociology at University of Warwick
- Murray Shanahan – Professor of Cognitive Robotics at Imperial College London
- Gray Scott – Futurist, executive producer of this production
- Vivek Wadhwa – Entrepreneur, academic and Director of Research at the Center for Entrepreneurship and Research Commercialization at the Pratt School of Engineering, Duke University
- Zoltan Istvan – Transhumanist and journalist
- Joanna Cook – Anthropologist, University College London
- Nicholas Kamara – Physician, Kable Hospital
- David Pearce – Transhumanist philosopher and co-founder of Humanity+
- Peter Cochrane – Futurist and entrepreneur
- John Harris – Bioethicist, philosopher and Director of the Institute for Science, Ethics and Innovation at the University of Manchester
- Riva Melissa-Tez – Entrepreneur and transhumanist
- Ian Pearson – Futurologist
- Stuart Armstrong – Artificial intelligence researcher at Future of Humanity Institute

== See also ==
- Humans Need Not Apply
