= Shnayer Leiman =

American scholar & university teacher (born 1941)

Shnayer Z. Leiman (born Nov. 3, 1941), known professionally as Sid Z. Leiman, S.Z. Leiman, or in his publications written in Hebrew as (Hebrew: שניאור זלמן ליימן), is an American scholar specializing in Jewish studies. His areas of concentration have been on the Bible; Rabbinic literature; Medieval and early modern Jewish history; and to a lesser extent on Jewish ethics and modern Orthodox Judaism. He has lectured across the United States on academic and religious topics during the past 50 years and at Jewish heritage sites in Europe since 1997. He is a noted bibliophile with a personal collection of 30,000 Judaic books and thousands of historical artifacts.

Leiman has been called a Hebrew: ״יודע ספר״ ― signifying his "encyclopedic knowledge of traditional and scholarly Jewish books from the biblical period to the present day" ― and the "Sherlock Holmes of Jewish History".

== Personal life ==
Leiman was born in New York City to Harold I. Leiman (1911-2000), a rabbi, educator, author, and disciple of Shraga Feivel Mendlowitz, and Harriet (née Gross). In 1964, he completed his studies at both Brooklyn College (B.A.) and the Mirrer Yeshiva Central Institute (semikhah, 1965). In 1970, he received his Ph.D. degree from the University of Pennsylvania, Department of Oriental Studies. In 1969, he married Rivkah (née Landesman), a Stern College graduate and social worker. The couple has four children.

Though not a political activist, Leiman belonged to Shvil HaZahav ("The Golden Mean"), a centrist New York-based group favoring an Orthodox Jewish engagement in the Middle East peace process.

== Academic career ==
Leiman began his academic teaching career at Yale University, where he was a lecturer (1968-70), assistant professor (1970-72), and associate professor (1972-78) in religious studies. He offered classes in (among other areas) Jewish History and Literature of the Medieval period. In 1978, he was appointed Dean of the Bernard Revel Graduate School of Yeshiva University. He was also the school’s director of Jewish graduate education and professor of Jewish history, remaining there in those positions until 1981. In that year, he joined the 10-year-old Department of Judaic Studies at Brooklyn College, where he was Chairman (1981-87) and Professor of Judaics.

At the same time, Leiman was a visiting professor at Bernard Revel Graduate School. In 1991-92, a financial shortfall and low enrollment led Yeshiva University to moot a restructuring plan for Bernard Revel. Yeshiva College student protesters believed the plan would effectively close the institution, founded in 1937. Leiman served as co-chair of a Task Force proposing a plan to continue the school. He was "wary" of the outcome from the start and the Task Force’s recommendations were not fully accepted. Nonetheless, the school remained open. In 2018, Leiman was named distinguished professor of Jewish history and literature at Touro College, in their newly-formed Graduate School of Jewish Studies.

Leiman has also been a visiting professor at the Kennedy Institute of Ethics, Georgetown University, Washington (Jewish law and ethics, 1977-78); Hebrew University of Jerusalem (Bible, Spring 1985, and Jewish Studies, Summer 1992); and Harvard University (Center for Jewish Studies and Center for the Study of World Religions, Fall 1989). At Oxford University he was a Skirball Fellow in Jewish Studies at the Oxford Centre for Postgraduate Hebrew Studies (1994).

== Lecturing ==
=== Academic or religious ===
Leiman has lectured at Jewish religious institutions since 1967. During this time, in the United States he was a guest speaker in (among other places) California, Connecticut, Florida, Illinois, Massachusetts, Michigan, Missouri, New Jersey, New York, Ohio, Pennsylvania, Tennessee, and Texas. He has also spoken in Canada and Israel. Favored subjects included biblical and Bible-related topics (often in light of archeological and advanced scholarly discussion), the Emden-Eibeschutz controversy, Jewish ethical teachings (including Jewish ethics in medicine, such as the controversies surrounding Karen Ann Quinlan and John Harris’ "survival lottery"), separation of church and state, Jewish personalities, and modern Orthodox Judaism. He has also spoken on Jewish-Christian relations, and to Christian groups on Judaism and the Jewish contribution to Western civilization.

=== Jewish heritage site lectures ===
There are 19th century antecedents to Jewish heritage tourism from the United States, but the growth in such travel occurred from the 1970s, dramatically increasing after the fall of the Berlin Wall in 1989 and the dissolution of the Soviet Union in 1991. The phenomenon has become notable, and is the subject of academic study.

Leiman was speaking publicly about ancient Jewish heritage sites as early as 1977, but did not begin leading European "Jewish roots" tours until the late 1990s. He continued the practice for some 30 years. The tours have been to Belarus (Volozhin); Lithuania (for example, Kovno, Mir, Radin, Slobodka, Vilna); Ukraine (Berditchev, Haditch, Mezhibuz), and Germany, Austria, Slovakia, Czech Republic, Poland.

In 2015, when the Lithuanian government proposed building a conference and sports center on the site of the former, 400-year-old Vilna Jewish cemetery, Leiman was among those opposing the project. He urged others to speak against it, and was a member of the 2023 Prime Minister’s Commission advising her on the future of the cemetery. The plans were halted, but later revived in 2025.

== Critical assessment of Leiman's scholarly work ==
From the mid-19th Century, scholars formed a consensus view that the canon of the Hebrew Bible was closed at the Council of Jamnia (c. 90 CE) in reaction to the rise of Christianity. In his "provocative" study and most important work, Leiman challenged this reading by introducing a distinction between "canonical" and "inspired" literature. His conclusion (first formulated in his Ph.D. dissertation, published in book form in 1976; 2nd ed., 1991) was that the proper date was not later than the Maccabean period (mid-second century BCE).

At the time, one critic found Leiman’s approach "somewhat unsettling due to its narrowness," and another, while lauding the book's assemblage of all pertinent texts from the Talmud and Midrash, added that Leiman's "neat distinction" between canonical and inspired "may not be entirely convincing to some readers." A third scholar wrote that the book was important for "its critique of the scholarly consensus, which is often valid and acute." Jacob Neusner characterized the work as "meticulous, thorough, extremely well-researched, and, to this reader, persuasive and reliable, a fine work of scholarship and a model of critical intelligence joined to rich erudition."

Leiman's other major biblical studies work, The Canon and Masorah of the Hebrew Bible (1974), a compilation of previously-published articles on that subject in English, French and Hebrew, was originally prepared for his teaching use at Yale. Critics noted the awareness in the work of the "central importance and relevance" of the recently-discovered Dead Sea Scrolls, found the selections "well-chosen" and "ideal" for use by student or scholar.

Leiman has also written extensively on the Emden-Eibeschuetz controversy. According to Rachel Elior, these studies "provide a broad canvas of rich, scholarly, and balanced contributions" to the controversy, notably including the viewpoints of Eibeschuetz's "detractors and supporters".

== Scholarly publications ==
Leiman's scholarly articles, reviews and translations – over 150 items, plus two books and a series of five short Judaica studies monographs – have appeared mainly in English, as well as in Hebrew and Polish. A bibliography is available at LeimanLibrary.com.

A feature of his publications has been his resolution of historical puzzles, earning him the sobriquet the "Sherlock Holmes of Jewish History". For example, he discovered a copy of an engraving (long thought to be non-existent, or lost) of Saul Levi Morteira, the 17th Century Amsterdam rabbi who excommunicated Baruch Spinoza; he identified the first Talmudical academy in America; he revealed who was buried in the tomb of the Vilna Gaon; and he demonstrated how Yehudah Yudel Rosenberg used the works of Sir Arthur Conan Doyle in his writings about the Maharal of Prague.

=== Books ===
- (compiler), The Canon and Masorah of the Hebrew Bible: An Introductory Reader (New York: Ktav, 1974).
- The Canonization of Hebrew Scripture: the Talmudic and Midrashic Evidence (Hamden, Conn.: Transactions of the Connecticut Academy of Arts and Sciences v. 47, published for the academy by Archon Books, 1976); 2nd edition, pb, 1991.
- Rabbinic Responses to Modernity (New York: S.Z. Leiman, Judaica Studies Series 5, Fall 2007).

=== Articles (selected) ===
- Eliezer Berkovits, Man and God: Studies in Biblical Theology, reviewed in Tradition 11 (Spring 1971), 121-127.
- "Yavneh Studies in Naso," in Joel B. Wolowelsky, ed., Yavneh Studies in Parashat HaShavua: Bemidbar (New York: Yavneh, 1972), 3-7.
- "The Inverted Nuns at Numbers 10:35-36 and the Book of Eldad and Medad," Journal of Biblical Literature 93 (Sept. 1974), 348-355.
- "Jewish Ethics 1970-1975: Retrospect and Prospect," Religious Studies Review 2 (April 1976), 16-22.
- "Critique of Louis Jacobs," in M.M. Kellner (ed.), Contemporary Jewish Ethics (New York: Sanhedrin Press, 1978), 58-60.
- "Jewish Ethical Teaching and Technological Advance," in F.E. Greenspahn (ed.), Contemporary Ethical Issues in the Jewish and Christian Traditions (Hoboken, NJ: Ktav, 1986), 9-29.
- "The Scroll of Fasts: The Ninth of Tebeth," Jewish Quarterly Review n.s. 74 (Oct. 1983), 174-195.
- "Montague Lawrence Marks: In a Jewish Bookstore," Tradition 25 (Fall 1989), 59-69.
- "Yeshivat Or ha-Hayyim: The first Talmudical Academy in America," Tradition 25 (Winter 1990), 77-88.
- "Religious Books of Suspected Sabbatians," in Rafael Rosenbaum (ed.), Sefer haZikaron le-Rebbi Moshe Lipshitz (New York: Lipshitz, 1996), 885-894 (Hebrew).
- "Stosunek Jonatana Eibeschutza do rochu frankistow w Polsce," in M. Galas (ed.), Duchowosc Zydowska W Polsce (Krakow: 2000), 229-236 (Polish).
- (Hebrew: ׃ואת כל אשר אצוה אותך״ Was Rashi’s Torah Scroll Flawed?" Judaic Studies 2 (2003-4), 3-22.
- (with Simon Schwarzfuchs), "New Evidence on the Emden-Eibeschuetz Controversy: The Amulets from Metz," Revue des Etudes Juives 165 (2006), 229-249.
- (with Richard C. Steiner), "The Lost Meaning of Deuteronomy 33:2 as Preserved in the Palestinian Targum to the Decalogue," N.L. Fox et al, eds., Mishneh Todah: Studies in Deuteronomy and its Cultural Environment in Honor of Jeffrey H. Tigay (Eisenbrauns: Winona Lake, 2009), 157-166.
- Joseph Foxman, "Faigel Dem Rov's" ["Faigel, the Rabbi's Daughter", 1957], translated from the Yiddish, Tradition 45 (Fall 2012), 89-94.
- "Rabbinic Openness to General Culture in the Early Modern Period in Western and Central Europe," in J. J. Schachter (ed.), Judaism’s Encounter with Other Cultures (Jerusalem: Maggid Books, 2017), 177-275.

=== Contributor ===
- Encyclopedia Britannica (15th ed., 1974)
- Encyclopaedia Judaica (1st edition, 1972)
- Encyclopaedia Mikra'it (Hebrew: ׃אנציקלופדיה מקראית), vol. 8
- Editor, Yale Judaica Series (1988-96)

== Recognition ==
- Yale University, Morse Fellow in the humanities (1971-72).
- National Endowment for the Humanities Grantee (1974).
- Lady Davis Fellow and visiting professor, Hebrew University of Jerusalem (Spring 1990).
- Festschrift: Yitzhak Berger and Chaim Joseph Milikowsky (eds.), "In the dwelling of a sage lie precious treasures": essays in Jewish Studies in honor of Shnayer Z. Leiman (New York: Ktav Publishing, 2020).
