= Mildred Z. Solomon =

American bioethics researcher

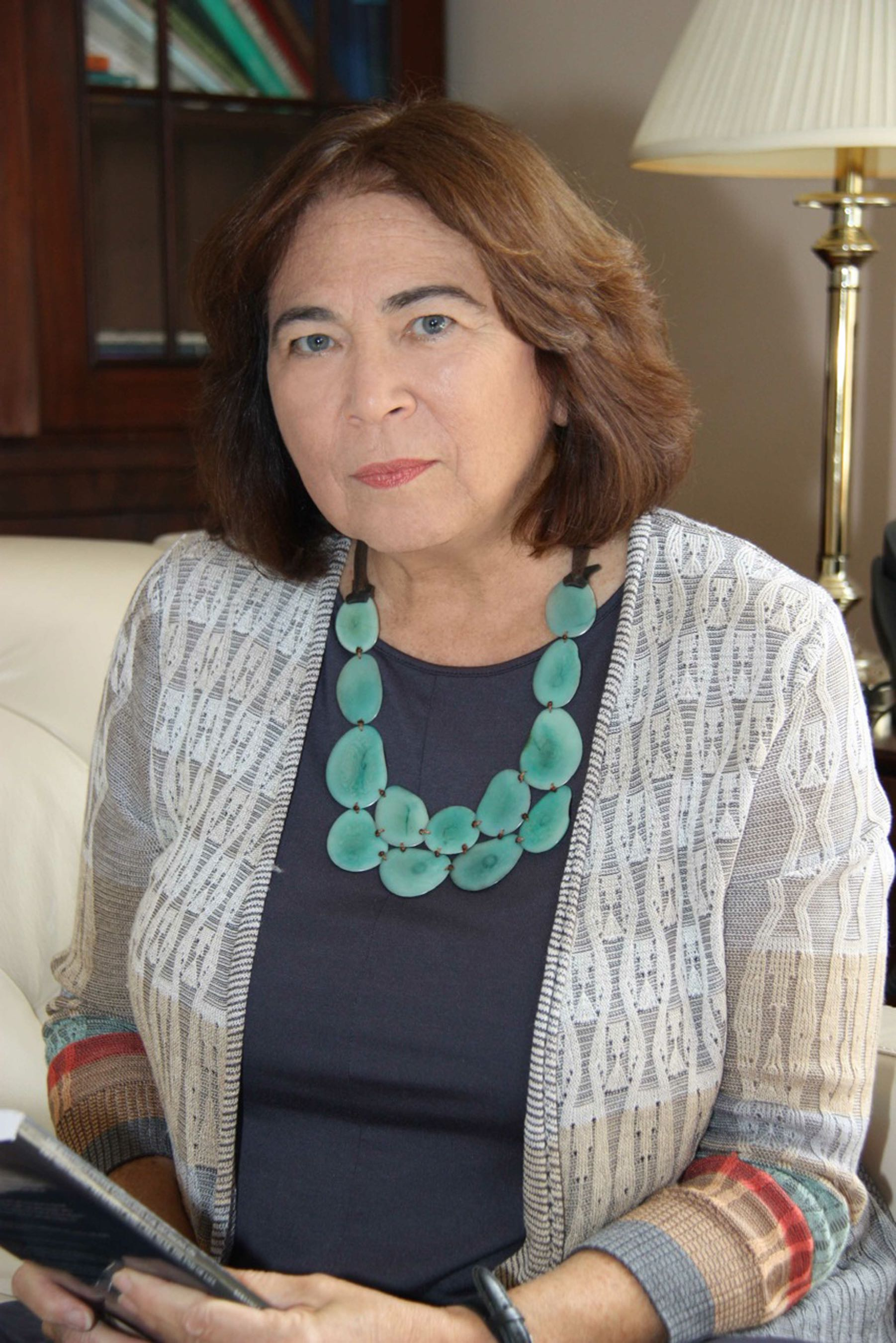
- President, The Hastings Center and Clinical Professor of Anaesthesia at Harvard Medical School
- Education: Harvard University (Ed.D.); Smith College (B.A.)
- Scientific career
- Fields: Bioethics, medical ethics, health policy, education

Mildred Z. Solomon is an American bioethics researcher.

She was for 11 years the president of The Hastings Center, an organization instrumental in the establishment of the field of bioethics. As of 2026, Vardit Ravitsky is the President and CEO of The Hastings Center for Bioethics. Solomon helped to develop the subfield of empirical ethics and has conducted numerous studies on a broad range of bioethics topics. She is also a professor at Harvard Medical School, where she directs the Fellowship Program at the Center for Bioethics at Harvard Medical School, which has prepared over 100 bioethicists from across the globe.

== Education ==
Solomon earned her doctorate in educational research methods and adult learning at Harvard University and her B.A. from Smith College.

== Career ==
Mildred Z. Solomon is President Emerita of The Hastings Center, the world-recognized bioethics institute focused on ethical issues in medicine, health care, life sciences research and the environment based in Garrison, New York.

In addition, she is Professor of Global Health & Social Medicine at Harvard Medical School where she directs the school’s Fellowship in Bioethics which is a program aimed at building the bioethics capacity of Harvard-affiliated hospitals. In addition to Fellows from the United States, her program has trained bioethicists from Germany, the United Kingdom, Switzerland, Israel, Australia, Italy and Iceland.

Solomon is a bioethicist and social science researcher who conducts both normative and empirical ethics research. The primary focus of her scholarship has been on the ethics of end-of-life care for both adults and children, organ transplantation, research ethics, particularly related to oversight of comparative effectiveness and implementation science, as well as professionalism and responsible conduct of research.

She has served on committees of the National Academies of Science, was a member of the U.S. Secretary of Health and Human Services’ Advisory Committee on Organ Transplantation, and consults to numerous Foundations and government agencies including the Presidential Commission for the Study of Bioethical Issues.

Solomon is also a bioethics educator. Early in her career, she co-founded the continuing medical education program, Decisions Near the End of Life, which was adopted by 230 hospitals across the United States, with approximately 40,000 clinicians participating in the program. She also founded The Initiative for Pediatric Palliative Care, which involved more than 2,000 pediatric sub-specialists, pediatric critical care nurses and related health care professionals.

Before assuming the leadership of The Hastings Center, Solomon was Senior Director of Implementation Science at the Association of American Medical Colleges, a membership association of all accredited medical schools in the United States and Canada, 450 teaching hospitals, and 90 medical and scientific specialty societies. At the AAMC, she was responsible for helping academic medical centers develop their capacities in comparative effectiveness research, patient outcomes research and implementation science.
