= The Givers =

Book by David Callahan

The Givers: Wealth, Power, and Philanthropy in a New Gilded Age
- First edition
- Author: David Callahan
- Language: English
- Genre: Non-fiction
- Publisher: Alfred A. Knopf
- Publication date: 2017
- Publication place: United States
- Pages: 343
- ISBN: 9781101971048
- OCLC: 1036844219
- Preceded by: Fortunes of Change

The Givers: Wealth, Power, and Philanthropy in a New Gilded Age is a 2017 non-fiction book by David Callahan published by Alfred A. Knopf.

== Overview ==
Prior to writing The Givers, Callahan wrote seven nonfiction books, including his 2010 publication, Fortunes of Change: The Rise of the Liberal Rich and the Remaking of America, in which he described the emerging upper class of "cosmopolitan elite", "super-educated" "professionals and entrepreneurs" who adopt "key liberal ideas as multiculturalism and active government" and who work in "knowledge" industries. In The Givers, which is based on extensive research and interviews, Callahan described a "secret world" of a new wave of philanthropists, people like Mark Zuckerberg, who are elite philanthropists involved in what he calls "big philanthropy." He calls them "grandmasters", "super-citizens", "disrupters", the "new Medicis", and "agents of wealth". Some have inherited wealth and are powerful networkers, advocating for progressive causes, including education, the environment, science, and LGBT rights. He writes that thousands of donors are able to promote their causes "under the radar" as the focus falls on Bill Gates and Charles Koch. Callahan writes that the new Givers are using their money to influence public policy in what he calls, the second Gilded Age. He cautions that this "power shift" has implications for all of American society.

== Reviews ==
In his April 14, 2017 The New York Times review, author and Wealth Matters columnist, Paul Sullivan, described The Givers as a book that investigates the "power of philanthropists to shape America." It reveals the private world of high-profile philanthropists who hold great influence in American life and politics."

Callahan cautions that everyone should be at "least a teensy bit nervous" about the rise of this "new breed of megadonors", according to Michelle Cottle, her April 28, 2017 Times review. Cottle, who is a contributing editor at The Atlantic wrote that these donors are "more numerous, more aggressive and vastly richer than their forebears" and that their ability to "reshape American society" is "unprecedented". '

The April 2017 Washington Post review said that Callahan had "performed a public service by assembling a striking body of information on a fundamental aspect of 21st-century America, a century when the wealth of the average family has stagnated while the wealth of the rich has soared." Callahan predicts that in within the "foreseeable future", philanthropic spending could increase to the point that it would supplant the federal government in "social programs, medical research", and assistance for the poor among many other areas." This would mean that private citizens private citizens would direct the spending, "unsupervised by any public authority", according to Post.

The Time review cites Callahan saying, that an unintended consequence of "megafoundations" spending "massive amounts of money" to cure disease or to redesign public education, is that it can undermine the democratic process. Callahan says that "government incentives" related to philanthropy and advocacy, are "outdated" which means that the wealthiest people have a greater influence than ordinary citizens in public policy making.

The Atlantic March 28, 2017 review reiterated Callahan's point, that philanthropists are replacing and supplanting government in decision-making, regarding which "scientific issues are researched, what types of schools exist in communities, and what initiatives get on ballots."

The Wall Street Journal called it a war on philanthropy with the Kochs, Waltons, Bill Gates, Eli Broad and others "treated as punching bags for ideological reasons."

The Financial Times and The Atlantic also reviewed the book.

== Interviews and book tours ==
Callahan's book tours included events held at the New York Public Library, and the Commonwealth Club of San Francisco.

In his NPR Weekend Edition interview, Callahan noted that the number of billionaires on Forbes' 400 richest Americans had increased from 13 in 1982, to 400 by 2017.

He also participated in interviews on several local public radio stations, including WNYC.

In a lengthy interview with Paul Shoemaker in the Town Hall Seattle on April 25, 2017, Callahan described ways in which this new wave of philanthropists differed from previous generations. Particularly those engaged in the knowledge industry, want to be disrupters—capable of enacting real changes. Shoemaker, who is the founding president of international philanthropy group Social Venture Partners, asked Callahan about the power leveraged by philanthropists. Callahan described how as economic inequality has increased since the late 1980s, this translated into "civic and political inequality."
