= History and Future of Justice =

2004 book by Vojin Rakic

History and Future of Justice (2004) is book by philosopher and political scientist Vojin Rakic. It analyzes the thesis that history is marked by a slow but progressive development of freedom and justice, and that the 'end of history' will be marked by a condition of perfect freedom and perfect justice, provided that history does not come to an `untimely end`. He asserts that, in spite of all the tragic and inhumane events in our history, a view of the overall historical development of humanity reveals a progress from epochs in which only some were free (e.g., Ancient Greece, Ancient Rome, the Middle Ages) to periods in which liberal and democratic concepts are gradually suppressing extremely inegalitarian and authoritarian regime types. The historical development of freedom in humanity Rakic believes to translate in the development of the opportunity of humans to act in a just manner on the basis of their free will. A topical book influenced by History and Future of Justice is The Evolution of God by Robert Wright (see Wright, 2009). For a recent article that applies the ideas from History and Future of Justice to the moral evolution of humanity as a follow-up of its physical evolution, see Rakic (2009).
