= David Callahan =

American author

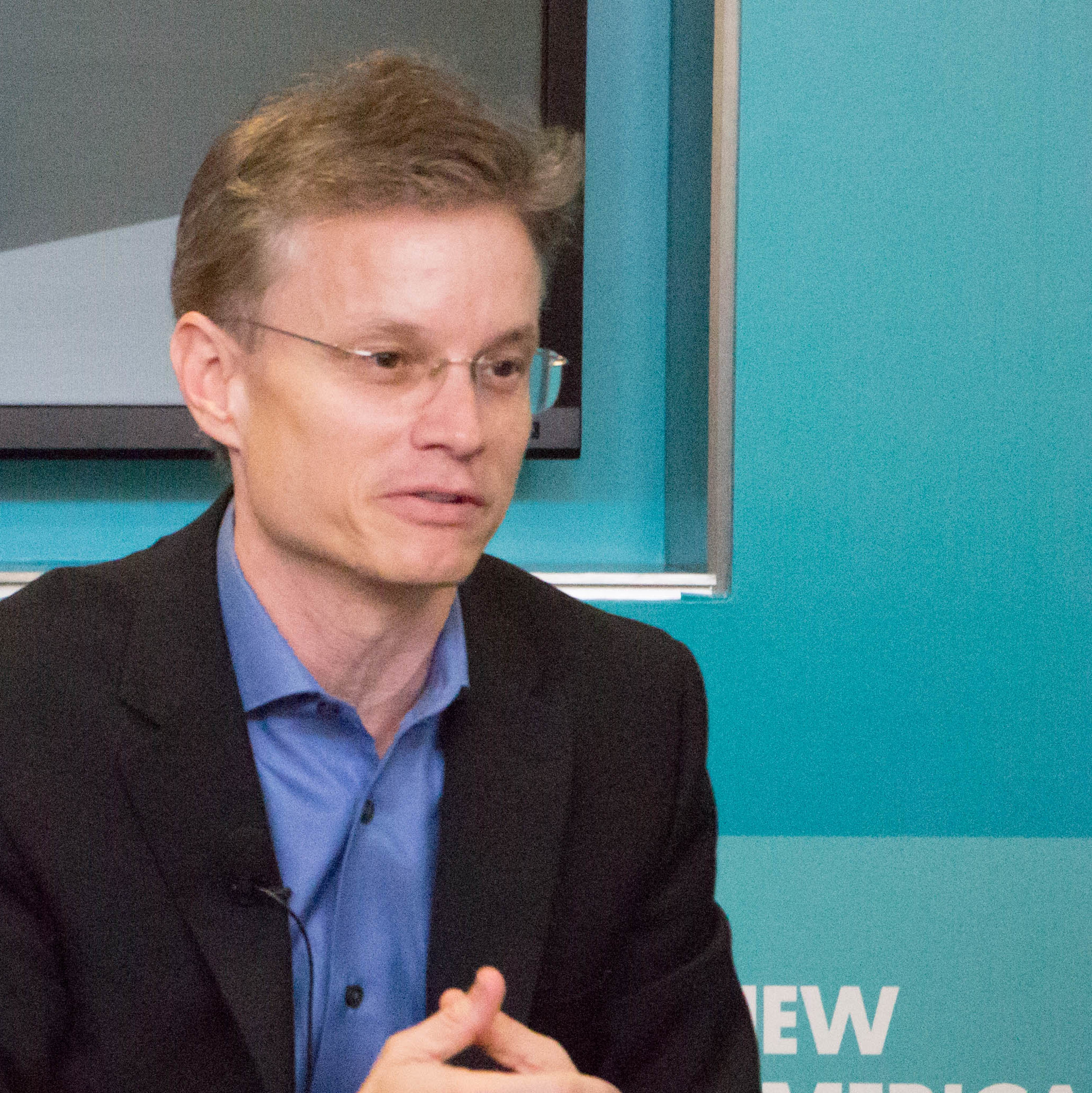
- Callahan in 2017
- Born: United States
- Education: Hampshire College (BA); Princeton University (PhD)
- Occupations: Author; journalist; editor
- Relatives: Daniel Callahan (father)
- Writing career
- Period: 1990–present
- Notable works: Demos co-founder Inside Philanthropy founder

David Callahan is an American writer and editor. He is the founder and editor of Inside Philanthropy, a digital media site. Previously, he was a senior fellow at Demos, a public policy group based in New York City that he co-founded in 1999. He is also an author and lecturer. He is best known as the author of the books The Givers and The Cheating Culture.

== Early life and education ==
David Callahan is the son of bio-ethicist Daniel Callahan and psychologist Sidney Callahan. He grew up in Hastings-on-Hudson, New York.

He received his B.A. at Hampshire College, and in 1997 received a PhD in Politics from Princeton University.

== Career ==
Callahan was a fellow at The Century Foundation from 1994 to 1999; his work area was US foreign policy and international affairs.

In 1999, Callahan co-founded the liberal think tank Demos. He left Demos in 2013 to start Inside Philanthropy.

=== Inside Philanthropy ===
Callahan launched the news website Inside Philanthropy in early 2014. The site's tag line is "Who's Funding What, and Why." It covers news about recent gifts by foundations and major donors, as well as the world of fundraising and trends in philanthropy. The site also includes profiles of funders to help nonprofits find money and publishes a daily newsletter. In addition, it issues its own set of annual awards, the "IPPYs," that include categories such as the "Philanthropist of the Year" and "Foundation President of the Year." Inside Philanthropy is mainly funded by subscriptions, which currently cost $397 a year or $47 a month. The site says that it "has never taken money from the funders we cover and never will."

== Writing ==
In addition to his articles in Inside Philanthropy, Callahan has written articles for The Washington Post, Los Angeles Times, The New York Times, Foreign Policy, The American Prospect, and The Nation.

In 1997 he wrote a political-thriller novel, State of the Union, in which Islamic terrorists — unknowingly under the control of an American billionaire populist plotting a coup against the U.S. government — plot to hijack planes and crash them into the Capitol building during the State of the Union address.

In 2002, Callahan wrote the book Kindred Spirits: Harvard Business School's Extraordinary Class of 1949 and How They Transformed American Business, a history of the Harvard Business School Class of 1949. In an interview about the book with The New York Times, Callahan contrasted this earlier group of business leaders, many of whom frowned on conspicuous consumption, with later generations of business leaders more motivated by greed.

A New York Times review of his 2004 book, The Cheating Culture: Why More Americans Are Doing Wrong to Get Ahead, Chris Hedges called Callahan "a new liberal with old values". The book links the rise in unethical behavior in American society to economic and regulatory trends—particularly growing inequality. The libertarian magazine Reason criticized Callahan for placing too much blame for cheating on the rise of laissez-faire economics.

His 2007 book The Moral Center examines how a market-based economy, i.e. capitalism, with its elevation of self-interest, undermines values that both liberals and conservatives care about. The American Prospect reviewed the book.

His 2017 book The Givers: Wealth, Power, and Philanthropy in a New Gilded Age looks at top philanthropists such as Michael Bloomberg and Mark Zuckerberg. The book was widely reviewed, including in The New York Times, The Washington Post, The Wall Street Journal, Financial Times, Time, and The Atlantic. The Givers generated wide discussion and controversy in the world of philanthropy, including in industry publications such as The Chronicle of Philanthropy, Stanford Social Innovation Review, and Philanthropy magazine.

== Bibliography ==
- Callahan, David (1990). Dangerous Capabilities: Paul Nitze and the Cold War. New York, NY: HarperCollins. ISBN 978-0-06-016266-5.
- Callahan, David (1994). Between Two Worlds: Realism, Idealism, and American Foreign Policy After the Cold War. New York: HarperCollins Publishers. ISBN 978-0-06-018213-7.
- Callahan, David (1998). Unwinnable Wars: American Power and Ethnic Conflict. New York: Hill and Wang. ISBN 978-0-8090-3064-4.
- Callahan, David (1998). State of the Union. New York: Signet. ISBN 978-0-451-19725-2.
- Callahan, David (2002). Kindred Spirits: Harvard Business School's Extraordinary Class of 1949 and How They Transformed American Business. Hoboken, N.J.: J. Wiley. ISBN 978-0-471-41819-1. OCLC 50630480.
- Callahan, David (2004). The Cheating Culture: Why More Americans Are Doing Wrong to Get Ahead. Orlando, Fla.: Harcourt. ISBN 978-0-15-603005-2. OCLC 858674447.
- Callahan, David (2007). The Moral Center: How Progressives Can Unite America Around Our Shared Values. Orlando: Harcourt. ISBN 978-0-15-603298-8.
- Callahan, David (2010). Fortunes of Change: The Rise of the Liberal Rich and the Remaking of America (1 ed.). Hoboken, N.J: Wiley. ISBN 978-0-470-17711-2.
- Callahan, David (2017) [2010]. The Givers: Wealth, Power, and Philanthropy in a New Gilded Age. Alfred A. Knopf. ISBN 9781101947050.
