= Demos (U.S. think tank) =

American liberal think tank

- Formation: 2000; 26 years ago
- Founder: Charles Halpern, David Callahan, Stephen Heintz
- Type: Think tank
- Headquarters: New York City, New York, U.S.
- President: Taifa Smith Butler
- Revenue: $7.62 million (2025)
- Expenses: $8.58 million (2025)
- Website: demos.org

Demos is a liberal think tank based in the United States. Founded in 2000, Demos' stated mission is to "power the movement for a just, inclusive, multiracial democracy." The organization's president is Taifa Smith Butler, formerly of the Georgia Budget and Policy Institute.

== History ==
=== Founding ===
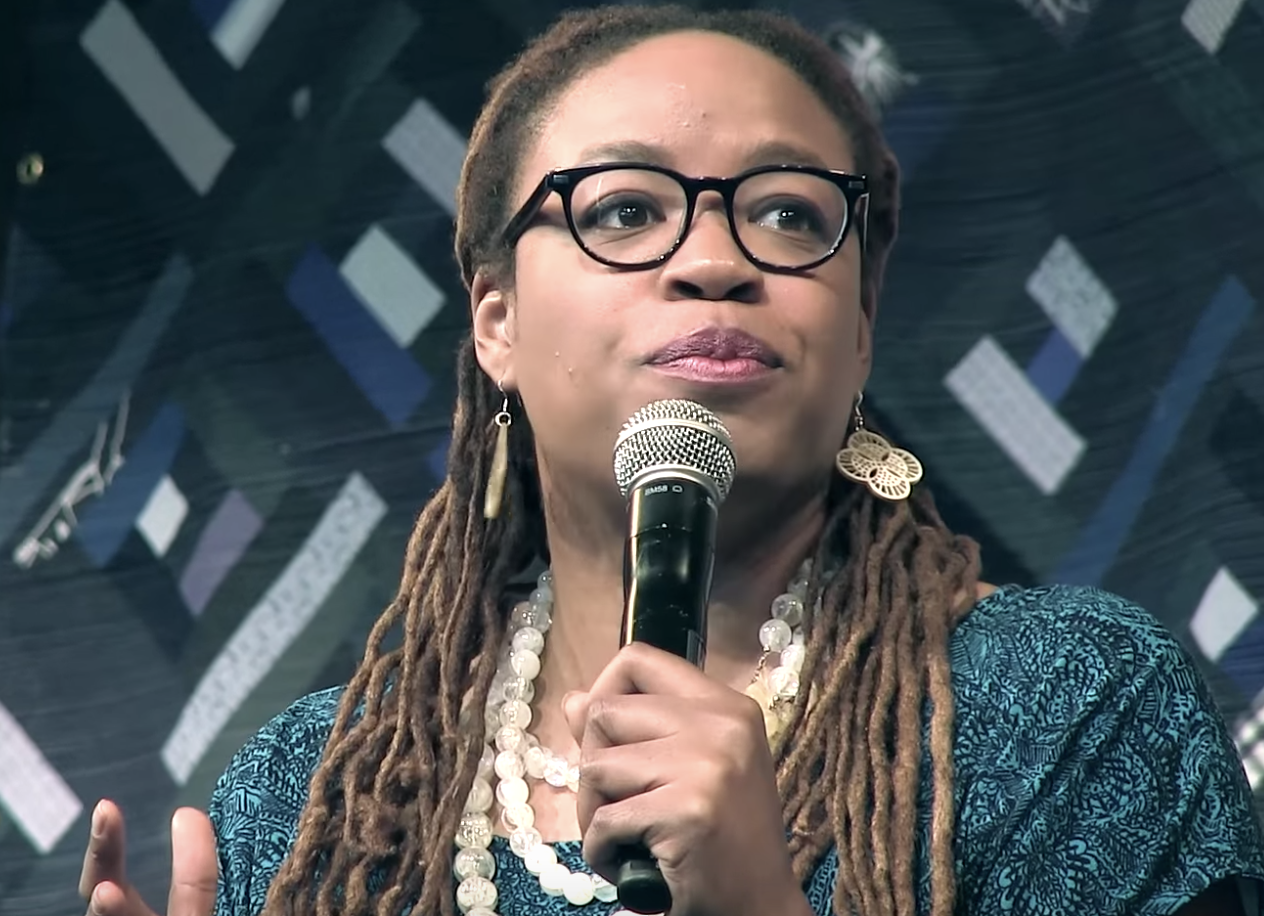
Heather McGhee led Demos between 2014 and 2018.

Demos was conceptualized in the late 1990s by Charles Halpern, president of the Nathan Cummings Foundation from 1989 to 2000. Halpern wanted to create a counter-force to the growing influence of the many right-wing think tanks such as The Heritage Foundation and establish a multi-issue organization that would focus on progressive policy development and advocacy. David Callahan, a fellow at the Century Foundation, and Stephen B. Heintz, vice president of the EastWest Institute, joined Halpern in helping to found Demos.

Founding board members included Arnie Miller, of Isaacson Miller, an executive search firm; David Skaggs, a Colorado Congressman; and future President Barack Obama, then an Illinois State Senator.

In March 2000, Demos opened its first office in New York City with Stephen B. Heintz as president. In this first year, Demos' work focused on solving economic inequities and increasing civic participation by developing a more inclusive democracy. These two areas continue to be a large part of Demos' core work. In 2001, Heintz stepped down and was replaced by Miles S. Rapoport, a Connecticut legislator (1985–1995) and Secretary of State (1995–1999).

In March 2014, Rapoport left Demos to become the President of Common Cause, a watchdog group. Heather McGhee, formerly the Vice President of Policy and Outreach at Demos, became the organization's president. McGhee is now a Distinguished Senior Fellow at Demos. In 2018, Demos named Sabeel Rahman as the new president.

In 2016, Demos fired blogger Matt Bruenig after he called the Center for American Progress's president Neera Tanden a scumbag.

== Issues ==
Demos was part of a settlement in a lawsuit, filed in 2005, alleging Ohio Secretary of State Ken Blackwell, Governor Bob Taft, and their predecessors failed to protect the fundamental rights of eligible Ohio voters to cast a meaningful ballot, as required by the Equal Protection and Due Process Clauses of the Fourteenth Amendment to the United States Constitution. The settlement was binding and required the state to provide for uniformity and consistency in Ohio election procedures so that the opportunity to vote can be enjoyed equally by all Ohio citizens.

== See also ==
- Democratic deficit
