= Arthur Caplan =

American bioethicist (born 1950)

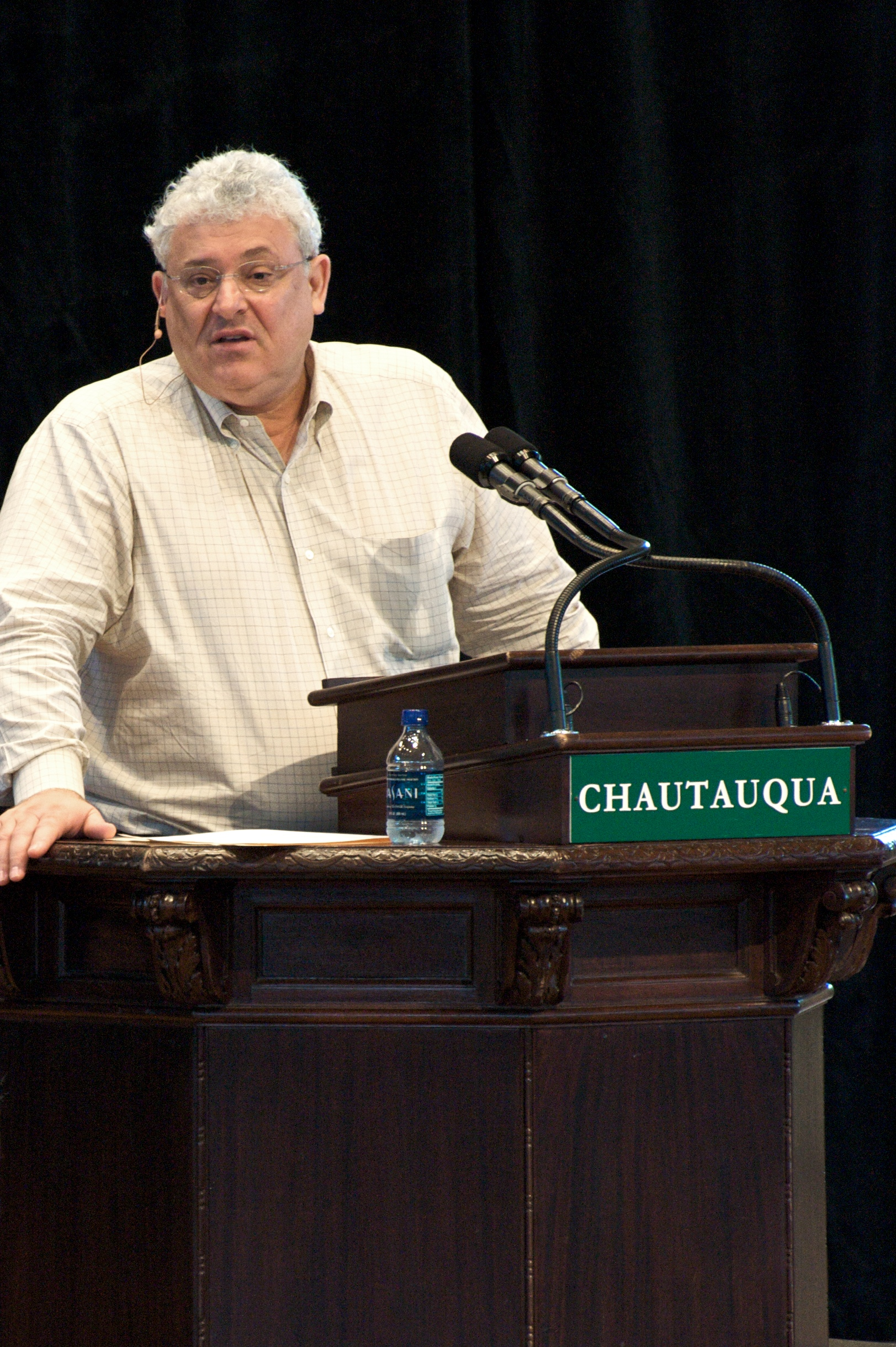
- Caplan in 2008
- Born: 1950 (age 75–76); Boston, Massachusetts, U.S.
- Education: Brandeis University (BA); Columbia University (MA, MPhill, PhD)
- Spouses: Jane Stojak; Meg O’Shea
- Scientific career
- Fields: Bioethics
- Workplaces: New York University Grossman School of Medicine Division of Medical Ethics; University of Pennsylvania; University of Minnesota, Twin Cities; Hastings Center
- Doctoral advisor: Ernest Nagel; Sidney Morgenbesser
- Website: Official website

External videos
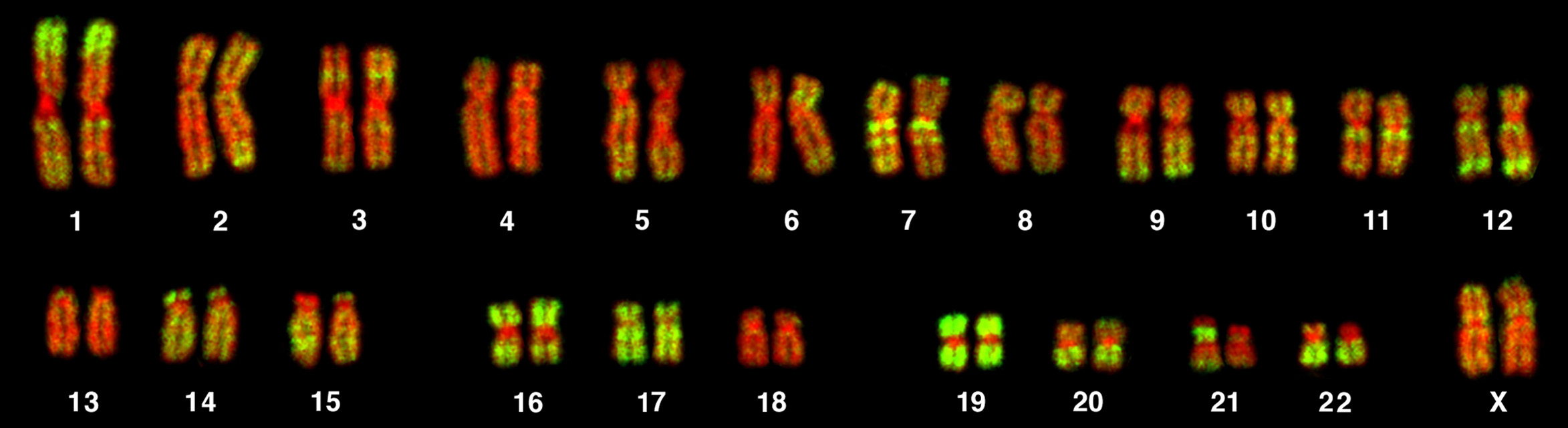
- “The Ethics of Genetically Engineering Children”, Arthur Caplan, December 2, 2008
- ”Dying in a Democracy”, Arthur Caplan, March 2013
- ”Organ Harvest in China and Killing on Demand ”, Arthur Caplan, April 3, 2012

Arthur L. Caplan (born 1950) is an American ethicist who is a professor emeritus of bioethics at New York University Grossman School of Medicine. He is known for his contributions to US public policy, including helping to found the National Marrow Donor Program; creating required requests in cadaver organ donation adopted throughout the United States; helping to create the system for distributing organs in the US; and advising on the content of the National Organ Transplant Act of 1984, rules governing living organ donation, and legislation and regulation in areas of health care including blood safety and compassionate use.

== Early life and education ==
Born in Boston in 1950 to Sidney D. and Natalie Caplan, Arthur Caplan grew up in Framingham, Massachusetts. He has described his family as "Workmen's Circle, Zionist, and secular." He credits his Jewish background with stimulating his interest in methods of inquiry and argument. At age six, Caplan was diagnosed with polio. He was successfully treated at Children's Hospital in Boston and went on to play sports at Framingham North High School. Caplan has stated that this illness was a formative experience that influenced his later commitment to philosophy and bioethics.

Caplan did his undergraduate work at Brandeis University, where he majored in philosophy. Caplan did his graduate work at Columbia University, receiving an M.A. in 1973, an M.Phil. in 1975, and a Ph.D. in the history and philosophy of science in 1979. Caplan met psychoanalyst and Dean of Education Bernard Schoenberg, who allowed him to participate as both an observer and a medical student in clinical rotations in the university's medical college.

== Career ==
In 1977, Caplan met Daniel Callahan, a philosopher who co-founded The Hastings Center with psychiatrist Willard Gaylin. In 1977, Caplan joined The Hastings Center as an associate and then became a post-doctoral fellow. He was the associate director from 1985 to 1987. During this time, Caplan published papers on genetics, evolution, sociobiology, and the teaching of ethics. He also became involved in the ethics of human and animal experimentation and new medical technologies, applying philosophy in public discourse and speaking on public policy issues.

In 1987, Caplan moved to the University of Minnesota, where he became a professor in the Departments of Philosophy and Surgery and the first director of the Center for Biomedical Ethics. In 1989, he organized the Center for Bioethics Conference on Medical Ethics and the Holocaust, the first conference convened to discuss bioethics and the Holocaust. He was active on issues relating to organ transplantation and genetics and worked with Rosalie A. Kane on dilemmas of "everyday ethics" involving treatment of the elderly. He also wrote about bioethics in relation to the Holocaust. In 1992, he joined the Medical Advisory Council of the United States Holocaust Memorial Museum.

Caplan secured the first apology for the Tuskegee Syphilis Study, from Lewis Sullivan, then secretary of HHS, in 1991. He worked with William Seidelman and others to secure in 2012 an apology from the German Medical Association for the role of German physicians in Nazi prison experiments during the Holocaust.

In May 1994, Caplan went to the University of Pennsylvania in Philadelphia where he founded the Center for Bioethics and the Department of Medical Ethics and had professorial appointments in departments including Medicine and Philosophy. In 2009, the Sidney D. Caplan Professor of Bioethics was established at the University of Pennsylvania's Perelman School of Medicine, named for Caplan's father. Caplan became the first holder of the professorship.

While at the University of Pennsylvania, he became the first bioethicist to be sued for his professional role, after his involvement in a gene therapy trial that resulted in the death of research subject Jesse Gelsinger. The family's suit was settled with the university for an undisclosed amount of money; Caplan was dropped from the suit.

In 2012, Caplan went to New York University's School of Medicine as the Drs. William F. and Virginia Connolly Mitty Professor of Bioethics and the founding director of the Division of Bioethics.

In May 2015, Caplan launched, with pharmaceutical company Johnson & Johnson, a pilot project for the equitable distribution of experimental drugs outside ongoing clinical trials. He created the Compassionate Use Advisory Committee (CompAC), a panel of bioethicists, physicians, and patient advocates, to respond to appeals from terminally ill patients for a cancer drug in development by J&J.

In early May 2020, the United States Conference of Mayors announced the Mayors Advisory Panel on Sports, Recreation & Health, with Caplan as a co-chair, to "advise mayors and sports and recreation officials on safe policies and practices as cities reopen from the COVID-19 pandemic", and in November 2020 he joined the NCAA COVID-19 Medical Advisory Group. MarketWatch featured Caplan in an article on the life of a bioethicist during the COVID-19 pandemic on August 4, 2020. Caplan has spoken and written on vaccine-related topics, including the ethics of placebo-controlled trials during the pandemic, what is owed to vaccine trial participants after a vaccine has been authorized, COVID-19 vaccination of transplant candidates.

Caplan has been criticized by some classical philosophers for his "hands-on philosophy", and by some colleagues for his enthusiastic engagement with the media.

In October 2020, Caplan criticized the editorial staff of the Journal of Applied Behavior Analysis for choosing not to formally retract the 1974 paper, "Behavioral treatment of deviant sex-role behaviors in a male child," co-authored by Ole Ivar Lovaas and George Rekers. The paper described Lovaas and Rekers' use of conversion therapy to force Kirk Murphy (then a 4-year-old boy behaving in a traditionally feminine way) to behave in a traditionally masculine manner. The journal's editorial staff claimed in an expression of concern and an editor's note added earlier that month that it would be inappropriate to retract the paper because they felt Lovaas and Rekers' study was ethically conducted for its time. Caplan, who told Retraction Watch he had "never seen such a 'historically oriented' disclosure," further stated:

I doubt you can retract all unethical studies from the literature. But, I find it troubling that this note says the study was not wrong by the standards of the day. I think many would have found punishing this behavior wrong by the standards of the day so I am not persuaded this note is accurate.

In 2021, Caplan published a commentary on a medical news website titled "It’s Okay for Docs to Refuse to Treat Unvaccinated Patients". This position was criticized by Lainie Friedman Ross in the American Journal of Kidney Diseases. In a CNN interview, Caplan said of the unvaccinated: "I'll condemn them. I'll shame them. [...] We can penalize them more. We can say, you're going to pay more on your hospital bill if you aren't vaccinated. You can't get life insurance or disability insurance at affordable rates if you aren't vaccinated." Caplan supported the removal of an unvaccinated patient who was near death from a hospital's transplant waitlist.

In 2022, Caplan advocated that pharmaceutical companies should stop doing business in Russia, an action that was criticized as advocating for a war crime.

== Academic work ==
Caplan is the author and editor of more than 35 books and more than 860 papers in peer-reviewed journals of medicine, science, philosophy, bioethics, and health policy.

Caplan has contributed to WebMD's Medscape and been a commentator on CNN, WOR Radio, and WGBH (FM)'s "Boston Public Radio." He has been a guest and commentator discussing public health issues like obesity, Ebola virus disease, Zika virus, vaccination, and COVID-19.

Caplan has been co-director of the Joint Council of Europe/United Nations Study on Trafficking in Organs and Body Parts. He was the co-director of a United Nations/Council of Europe Study on organ trafficking and has called for a new international convention on criminal organ trafficking. He has spoken out on international issues such as organ harvesting from Falun Gong practitioners in China.

Caplan was the chair of the Advisory Committee to the United Nations on Human Cloning, and was on the special advisory committee to the International Olympic Committee on genetics and gene therapy.

Caplan has been chair of the National Cancer Institute Biobanking Ethics Working Group and chair of the Advisory Committee to the Department of Health and Human Services on Blood Safety and Availability. He was a member of the Presidential Advisory Committee on Gulf War Illnesses and the special advisory panel to the National Institute of Mental Health on human experimentation on vulnerable subjects. He is an adviser to DARPA on synthetic biology and has addressed the Presidential Commission for the Study of Bioethical Issues. He has also was on the ethics committee of the American Society of Gene Therapy.

Caplan is on the board of trustees of the Institute for Ethics and Emerging Technologies. He also sat on the board of the National Center for Policy Research on Women & Families, the Franklin Institute, the Iron Disorders Foundation, and the National Disease Research Interchange.

== Awards and honors ==
Caplan was elected as a fellow of The Hastings Center in 1990, the American Association for the Advancement of Science in 1994, the College of Physicians of Philadelphia in 1994, the New York Academy of Medicine in 1997, and as an honorary fellow of the American College of Legal Medicine in 2008.

Caplan was named a person of the Year in 2001 by USA Today. In December 2008, Discover magazine named him one of the 10 most influential people in science, for ”translating philosophical debates into understandable ideas” and “democratizing bioethics.” He is one of the 10 most influential people in America in biotechnology, according to the National Journal; one of the 10 most influential people in the ethics of biotechnology, according to Nature Biotechnology; one of the 50 most influential people in American health care, according to Modern Health Care magazine; and one of the 100 most influential people in biotechnology, according to Scientific American magazine.

Caplan holds eight honorary degrees from colleges and medical schools. He received the McGovern Medal of the American Medical Writers Association in 1999 and the John P. McGovern Award Lectureship from the Medical Library Association in 2007. In 2014, he was given the public service award of the National Science Board/National Science Foundation. In May 2016, he received the Rare Impact Award from the National Organization for Rare Disorders (NORD).

== Personal life ==
Caplan met his wife Jane while at university. Their son was born in 1984.

== Selected publications ==
- Caplan, Arthur L., ed. (1992). When Medicine Went Mad: Bioethics and the Holocaust. Totowa, NJ: Humana Press. ISBN 978-0896032354.
- Magnus, David; Caplan, Arthur; McGee, Glenn, eds. (2002). Who Owns Life?. Amherst, N.Y.: Prometheus Books. ISBN 978-1-57392-986-8.
- Caplan, Arthur L., ed. (2004). Health, Disease, and Illness: Concepts in Medicine. Washington, D.C.: Georgetown Univ. Press. ISBN 978-1589010147.
- Caplan, Arthur L., ed. (2006). The Case of Terri Schiavo: Ethics at the End of Life. Amherst, NY: Prometheus Books. ISBN 9781591023982.
- Caplan, Arthur L. (2007). Smart Mice, Not-So-Smart People: An Interesting and Amusing Guide to Bioethics. Lanham, Md.: Rowman & Littlefield Publishers. ISBN 9780742541719.
- Sisti, Dominic A.; Caplan, Arthur L., eds. (2013). Applied Ethics in Mental Health Care: An Interdisciplinary Reader. Cambridge, Mass.: MIT Press. ISBN 9780262019682.
- Caplan, Arthur L.; Arp, Robert, eds. (2013). Contemporary Debates in Bioethics. [S.l.]: Wiley-Blackwell. ISBN 9781444337136.
- Caplan, Arthur L.; McCartney, James J.; Reid, Daniel P., eds. (2015). Replacement Parts: The Ethics of Procuring and Replacing Organs in Humans. Washington, D.C.: Georgetown University Press. ISBN 9781626162365.
- Caplan, Arthur L.; Parent, Brendan (2016). The Ethics of Sport: Essential Readings. New York: Oxford University Press. ISBN 978-0190210991.
- Schwartz, Jason; Caplan, Arthur L. (2017). Vaccination Ethics and Policy. Cambridge, MA: MIT Press. ISBN 9780262035330.
- Caplan, Arthur L.; Redman, Barbara K (2018). Getting to Good: Research Integrity in Biomedical Sciences. Cham, Switzerland: Springer International. ISBN 978-3-319-51358-4
- “Why We Can Thrive Past Seventy-Five: In Favor of Efforts to Extend the Human Lifespan,” Hastings Center Report 2025 (with C Ringel, M Ringel) https://doi.org/10.1002/hast.5007
- “Bioethicists Must Push Back Against Assaults on Diversity, Equity and Inclusion,” American Journal of Bioethics 2025: 1-7 (with N Jecker, V Ravitsky, P Smith, et al.) https://doi.org/10.1080/15265161.2025.2516974
- “In an Age of Anti-Intellectualism, What Is the Value of Expertise? Voices in Bioethics 2025, 11. 2025 (with B Pilkington, K Parsi, K) https://doi.org/10.52214/vib.v11i.13851
- “Fool’s Gold Science: The Ethical and Scientific Perils of Testing Most Vaccines Using Placebo-Controlled Randomized Trials,” EMBO Reports 2025: 3979-81 (with N Mamo, F Pasadyn) doi:10.1038/s44319-025-00530-5
- “How Stupid Has Science Been?” EMBO Reports 2025 https://doi.org/10.1038/s44319-025-00562-x
- “The Responsible Development of AAV Gene Therapies,” Human Gene Therapy 2025 (with J Wilson) doi:10.1177/10430342251359668
- “Should Scientists Be Allowed to Bring Distant Human Ancestors Back to Life?” PLOS Biology 2025 https://doi.org/10.1371/journal.pbio.3003384
- “Strengthening Research Ethics Capacity in West Africa, 2015–2024,” Journal of Empirical Research on Human Research Ethics 2025: 1-21 (with K Ferguson, C Adebamamo, An Adejumo, et al.) doi:10.1177/15562646251335076
- “Public Health Policymaking Outside of the Federal Government: Reflections on Authority and Trust-Building Challenges,” American Journal of Public Health 2025 (with L Taylor) https://doi.org/10.2105/AJPH.2025.308331
- “The Immorality of Nonconsensual Experimentation Using the Bodies of Deceased Pregnant Women: Is Stopping Life Support an Abortion?” American Journal of Obstetrics & Gynecology MFM 2025: 7:11 https://doi.org/10.1016/j.ajogmf.2025.101785
- “Leaving No One Behind: Ethical Guardrails for Geroscioence Research,” Research Ethics, 2026: 1-14 (with N Jecker, T Schiff, S Mann, J Savelescu) https://journals.sagepub.com/doi/10.1177/17470161261444843
- “Laundering Public Health: Using Autism to Revive Eugenics,” American Journal of Bioethics 2026 https://doi.org/10.1080/15265161.2026.2659519
- “The United States Platelet Shortage: Whole Blood Derived Platelets or Paying Donors?” Transfusion and Apheresis Science” 2026 (with J McCullough) https://doi.org/10.1016/j.transci.2026.104390
- “The Executive Order on ‘Crime and Disorder’: An Affront to Policy, Law, and Ethics,” Psychiatric Services 2026 (with B Barsky, D Sisti) https://doi.org/10.1176/appi.ps.20250505
- “Is Concurrent Gestational Surrogacy an Ethical Practice?” Fertility and Sterility 2026 (with M Bayefsky, A Copperman, C Violette, H Hipp) doi:10.1016/j.fertnstert.2025.12.017
- “Trump’s Statements About Acetaminophen and the Problem of Epistemic Corrections,” BMJ Evidence-Based Medicine 2026 (with G Spitale, F. Germani) https://doi.org/10.1136/bmjebm-2025-114372
- “Epstein Scandal: We Need New Rules on Links with Donors,” Nature 2026: 651, 283, March 12 https://www.nature.com/articles/d41586-026-00698-3
