= Inside Philanthropy =

Philanthropy news website

- Website type: Online Journalism
- Available in: English
- Editor: David Callahan
- Website: www.insidephilanthropy.com
- Registration: Optional
- Launched: 2013; 13 years ago
- Current status: Active

Inside Philanthropy is a digital company that analyzes notable philanthropic foundations and wealthy donors created by David Callahan in 2013. Its Grant Finder tool helps nonprofits learn how to approach funders and get grants with deep analysis not found on 990 tax filings. The company created by David Callahan in 2013.

The site issues its own set of awards, such as the Philanthropist of the Year award and the Boldest Philanthropic Vision award.

The site has been noted for naming wealthy people who Inside Philanthropy considers as scoring relatively poorly on "relative generosity", or percentage of wealth that a person has given away, even if they still give out a comparatively large amount of money in absolute terms.
