= Daniel Callahan =

American bioethicist (1930–2019)

- Born: Daniel John Callahan; July 19, 1930; Washington D.C.
- Died: July 16, 2019 (aged 88); Dobbs Ferry, New York
- Education: Harvard University (Ph.D.); Georgetown University (M.A.); Yale University (B.A.)
- Spouse: Sidney DeShazo (m. 1954)
- Children: 6
- Scientific career
- Fields: Bioethics, philosophy, ethics, medical ethics, health policy

Daniel John Callahan (July 19, 1930 – July 16, 2019) was an American philosopher who played a leading role in developing the field of biomedical ethics as co-founder of The Hastings Center, the world's first bioethics research institute. He served as the Director of The Hastings Center from 1969 to 1983, president from 1984 to 1996, and president emeritus from 1996 to 2019. He was the author or editor of 47 books.

== Life and career ==
=== Education ===
Daniel Callahan was born in Washington, D.C., on July 19, 1930.

In high school Callahan was a swimmer and chose to attend Yale University because of its competitive swimming program. While at Yale, he was drawn to interdisciplinary studies and graduated in 1952 with a double degree in English and Philosophy. He received the M.A. degree from Georgetown University in 1956 and the Ph.D. in philosophy from Harvard in 1965.

=== Catholic intellectual ===
From 1961 to 1968, Callahan worked as executive editor of Commonweal, a Catholic journal of opinion. Callahan became an influential writer and author within Catholic intellectual circles during this period, which was a tumultuous time in the Catholic Church. In addition to numerous articles in Commonweal, he wrote or edited nine books, including The Mind of the Catholic Layman, Honesty in the Church, and The Catholic Case for Contraception. The historian Rodger Van Allen once described Callahan as “perhaps the most influential Catholic layman of the 1960s.”

=== Abortion issue ===
During the late 1960s, Callahan left the Catholic Church—later explaining his disenchantment in the book Once a Catholic—and became interested in the intersection of medicine and ethics. With support from the Population Council and the Ford Foundation, Callahan traveled around the world to study how different countries approached the issue of abortion, as well as ethical issues in family planning and population control. The result was the groundbreaking 1970 book Abortion: Law, Choice, and Morality. Callahan would remain involved in debates over abortion for years to come and was often interviewed by the media on this subject. He described himself as "51 percent pro-choice. In 1984, he and wife Sidney Callahan—who took an anti-abortion position—co-edited a book, Abortion: Understanding Differences, that included essays from people on all sides of this issue. The couple's longstanding differences on abortion were once the subject of a feature in People magazine and they engaged in a number of public debates on abortion, including on PBS's MacNeil/Lehrer News Hour.

=== Bioethicist ===
In 1969, Callahan cofounded the Hastings Center with Willard Gaylin, a noted psychiatrist. The center, originally named the Institute for Society, Ethics and the Life Sciences, and based in Hastings-on-Hudson, New York, was the world's first research organization devoted to bioethics. It played a pioneering role in developing this field by bringing together scholars from across different disciplines, including medicine, law, science and philosophy. Such noted leaders in bioethics, such as Arthur Caplan and Robert M. Veatch, began their careers at the Hastings Center. Callahan served as the center's director from its inception to September 1, 1996. During that time, he wrote numerous articles and edited multiple books, including on issues of death and dying and genetics.

=== Health care ===
In 1987, Callahan published Setting Limits: Medical Goals in an Aging Society, a book that argued that U.S. society would need to limit expensive care for those very elderly Americans, who were unlikely to live long or good lives. The financial cost was too high, he argued, and came at the expense of pressing needs such as education. In his book he also proposed an "age-based standard for the termination of life-extending treatment". Upon its publication, The New York Times Book Review wrote: "This is a pivotal work that poses hard questions and proposes provocative answers. Setting Limits promises to be the benchmark for future moral, medical and policy discussions of aging." The book attracted wide attention and generated significant controversy, including two volumes of essays debating or criticizing Callahan's ideas. In 2009, Callahan was interviewed by NPR about his reflections on Setting Limits as he aged and responded to charges of hypocrisy for benefitting from expensive medical interventions.

Callahan followed up on Setting Limits with a series of books on health care, aging, technology and mortality. These included What Kind of Life: The Limits of Medical Progress (Simon & Schuster, 1990), The Troubled Dream of Life: In Search of a Peaceful Death (Simon & Schuster, 1993), in which he makes a case for "dependency", and argues that human beings are and ought to be a burden to each other; False Hopes (Simon & Schuster & Rutgers University Press, 1998); What Price Better Health? Hazards of the Research Imperative (University of California Press, 2003); Medicine and the Market: Equity vs. Choice (Johns Hopkins University Press, 2006); and Taming the Beloved Beast: Why Medical Technology Costs are Destroying Our Health Care System (Princeton University Press, August 2009).

Callahan lectured widely on his ideas on health care during this period through the United States and Europe. He was also a professor of psychology at Mercy University.

=== Awards and recognition ===
Callahan was an elected member of the Institute of Medicine, National Academy of Sciences; a member of the Director's Advisory Committee, the Centers for Disease Control and Prevention, and of the Advisory Council, Office of Scientific Responsibility, Department of Health and Human Services. He was awarded the Freedom and Scientific Responsibility Award of the American Association for the Advancement of Science in 1996. He was awarded the 2008 Centennial Medal of the Harvard Graduate School of Arts and Sciences. He testified in Congress on stem cell research and other issues.

== Published works ==
Callahan was the author or editor of 47 books. In addition to his books on abortion and health care, he is the author of The Tyranny of Survival (1973); Ethics in Hard Times (1982); The Roots of Bioethics: Health, Progress, Technology, Death (Oxford University Press, 2012); and The Five Horsemen of The Modern World: Climate, Food, Water, Chronic Illness, and Obesity (Columbia University Press, 2016). In addition, he's the author of a memoir, In Search of the Good: A Life in Bioethics (MIT Press, 2012). Callahan contributed articles to The New York Times, Daedalus, Harpers, The Atlantic, the New England Journal of Medicine, the Journal of the American Medical Association, The New Republic, Health Affairs, and other newspapers and journals.

== Personal life ==
In 1954 he married Sidney DeShazo, a notable Catholic feminist who has published under the name Sidney Callahan. They had six children, five boys and one girl, including the writer and editor, David Callahan and the film-maker Peter Callahan.
