= The Cheating Culture =

Book by David Callahan

The Cheating Culture: Why More Americans Are Doing Wrong to Get Ahead
- Author: David Callahan
- Language: English
- Genre: Non-fiction
- Publisher: HarperCollins
- Publication date: 2004
- Publication place: United States
- Pages: 366
- ISBN: 9780156030052
- OCLC: 858674447
- Preceded by: Kindred Spirits (2002)
- Followed by: The Moral Center (2007)

The Cheating Culture: Why More Americans Are Doing Wrong to Get Ahead is a nonfiction book, authored by David Callahan and published by Harcourt in 2004.

== Synopsis ==
The main thesis of the book is that the current state of American society, characterized by rampant inequality and a winner-take-all philosophy, produces the cheating that has been observed in business, law, academia, journalism, entertainment and medicine.

Cheating, of both illegal and legal forms, is pervasive in an American society where incentive-driven structures (e.g. stock options, production-based pay, fast-track career options) have gone haywire: Instead of promoting productivity and "fair play", they reward deception and chicanery. Callahan provides multiple examples of this phenomenon in recent American history.

In the 1980, when Sears instituted a production quota for its auto repair staff, mechanics began performing unnecessary and costly maintenance. Overbilling is common within the legal profession. Pressed to bill as much time as possible, young lawyers may overcharge clients. In the medical profession, physicians may overstate the symptoms of managed care patients, else insurers would deny coverage.

Not restricted to professions, cheating now appears in all facets of American life. According to Callahan, cheating breeds upon a dynamic between a "winner class", an upper-class so influential they effectively are exempt from most rules and standards, and an "anxious class", often compelled to cheat during a period of downward social mobility, downsizing, and within a cultural climate that values money and power above personal integrity.

Callahan shows, however, that large-scale cheating is most prevalent among the "Winner" upper class. Despite their high salaries and opulent lifestyles, they live in constant comparison with those who have more than them, and therefore exhibit lives characterized by high spending, severe anxiety, and countless opportunities and temptations to cheat.

The author, however, also notes that blame for the cheating phenomenon does not lie upon a single class of people. Rather, it represents the individualistic ambitions of the amorphously defined "Me" generation, mixed dangerously with laissez-faire principles espoused by the 1980s neoliberals, and implemented, to America's detriment, during the "get-rich-quick" era of the 1980s and 1990s.

While speaking about the book in Denver, Colorado, Callahan said that the level of the public's trust is low to the point of being "poisonous". Throughout his book, he states that cynical attitudes and lack of trust in others produce cheating. For example, one expecting to be "screwed" by others is more likely to cheat others, in order to compensate. Members of higher socio-economic groups frequently victimize members of lower socio-economic groups. The 1980s and 1990s were characterized by an emphasis on self-interest, maintaining the individualism and anticonformism of the 1960s but shedding the community-oriented ideals of social responsibility and personal integrity. American society has a "schizophrenic personality": it tends to cyclically alternate between a spirit of self-interest, and an attitude of communal interest. The last period of vulgar self-interest, according to Callahan, was during the American 1920s, prior to Black Tuesday and the onset of the Great Depression.
