= Heather McGhee =

American political commentator and strategist (born 1980)

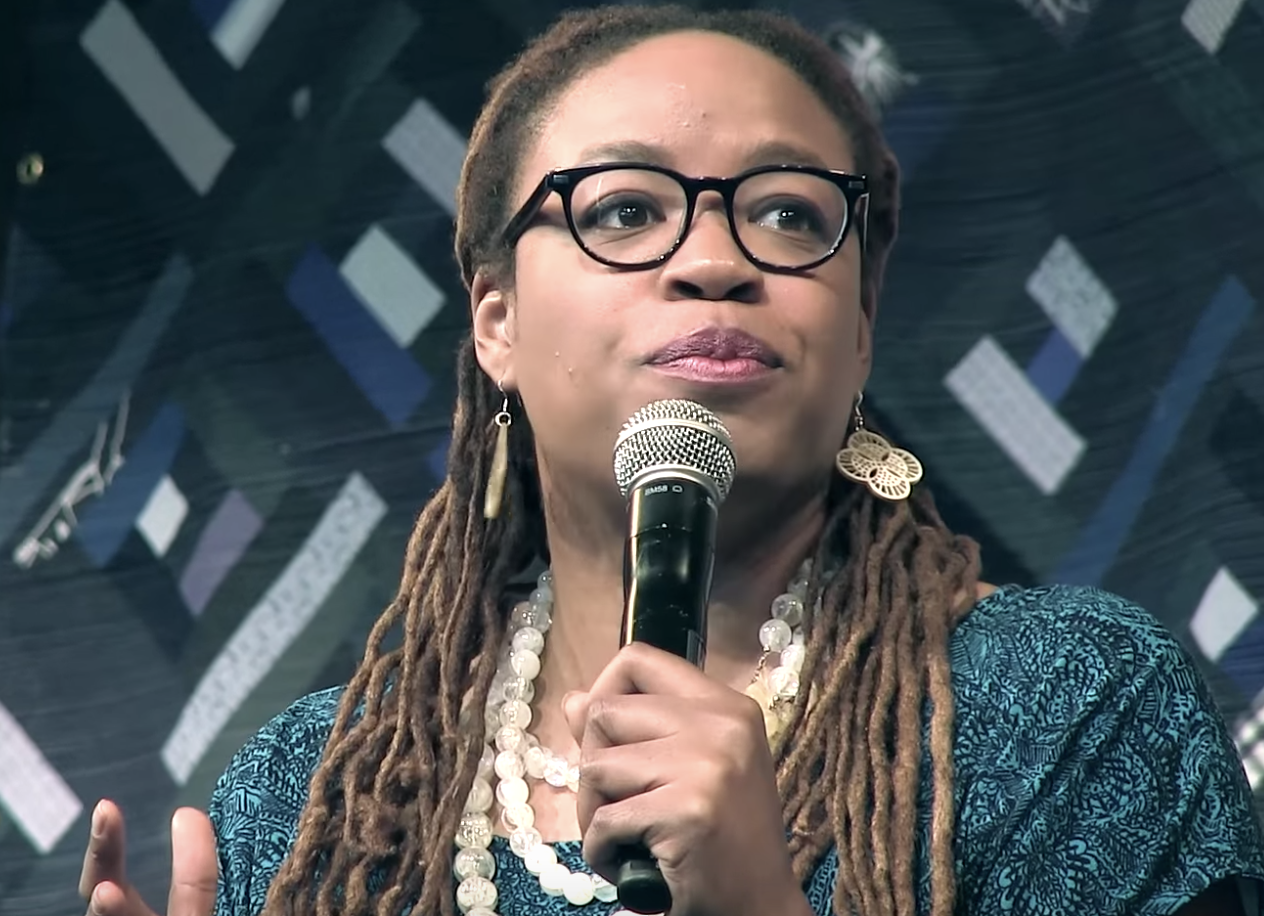
- Born: Heather Charisse McGhee; June 6, 1980 (age 45); Chicago, IL
- Education: Yale University (BA); University of California, Berkeley (JD)
- Spouse: Cassim Shepard

Heather Charisse McGhee (born June 6, 1980) is an author and nonprofit executive. She is a former president and currently a trustee emeritus of Demos, a non-profit progressive U.S. think tank. McGhee is a regular contributor to NBC News and frequently appears as a guest and panelist on Meet the Press, All In with Chris Hayes, and Real Time with Bill Maher.

== Early life and education ==
Heather Charisse McGhee grew up on Chicago's South Side and is the daughter of Gail C. Christopher and Earl J. McGhee. In seventh grade, McGhee enrolled in the Bement School as a boarding student. She graduated from Milton Academy in 1997. McGhee received a B.A. in American studies from Yale University in 2001. She was initially drawn to theater and creative writing but eventually became interested in economic policy.

McGhee attended the UC Berkeley School of Law, citing how law school could help give her the credentials to change public policy. She graduated with a J.D. in 2009.

== Career ==
=== Positions ===
After graduating from Yale in 2001, she taught English in Barcelona for a short time, but soon after the September 11 attacks she moved to Hollywood to pursue a career in television writing.

After about a year, she moved to New York City and began working with the non-profit think tank, Demos. In 2003, McGhee first connected with Elizabeth Warren and her daughter, Amelia Warren Tyagi, on the topic of credit card debt.

She left Demos to attend law school and serve as a Deputy Policy Director for the John Edwards 2008 presidential campaign.

McGhee returned to Demos in 2009 and co-chaired a task force with Americans for Financial Reform which helped develop the Dodd-Frank Wall Street Reform and Consumer Protection Act in 2009. McGhee became the president of Demos in 2014. In early 2018, she stepped down as president but remained a distinguished senior fellow at Demos.

In December 2019 McGhee became chair of the board of directors of Color of Change.

=== Appearances and talks ===
In 2016, McGhee's televised phone conversation with a man named Gary on C-SPAN who admitted racial prejudice ("I'm a White male, and I am prejudiced. The reason it is something I wasn't taught but it's kind of something that I learned.") was widely covered by news media organizations and viewed over a million times. A year later, Gary stated he had taken her advice to heart and his views had changed.

In 2019, McGhee presented a TED talk entitled "Racism has a cost for everyone."

In 2021, McGhee was interviewed by Christiane Amanpour on CNN, titled "Why racism hurts everyone, regardless of race."

McGhee has appeared on episodes of Pod Save America and was a guest host for a live recording of the podcast in Boston.

In September 2022, McGhee gave a brief interview with NPR's Ari Shapiro to discuss the student debt crisis.

== The Sum of Us: What Racism Costs Everyone and How We Can Prosper Together ==
In March 2021, her book The Sum of Us: What Racism Costs Everyone and How We Can Prosper Together debuted at #3 on the New York Times best seller list (for non-fiction). In it she discusses what she calls "drained-pool politics", symbolized by the wilful shutting down of public swimming pools in the South in response to desegregation mandates. She argues that white Americans "have been steeped in the notion of 'zero sum' — that any gains by another group must come at white people's expense." She believes "the task ahead, then, is to unwind this idea of a fixed quantity of prosperity and replace it with what I've come to call Solidarity Dividends: gains available to everyone when they unite across racial lines, in the form of higher wages, cleaner air and better-funded schools."

In July 2022, McGhee debuted "The Sum of Us Podcast", which expands on her book by the same title.
