= John Sulston =

British biologist and academic (1942–2018)

Sir John Sulston CH FRS MAE
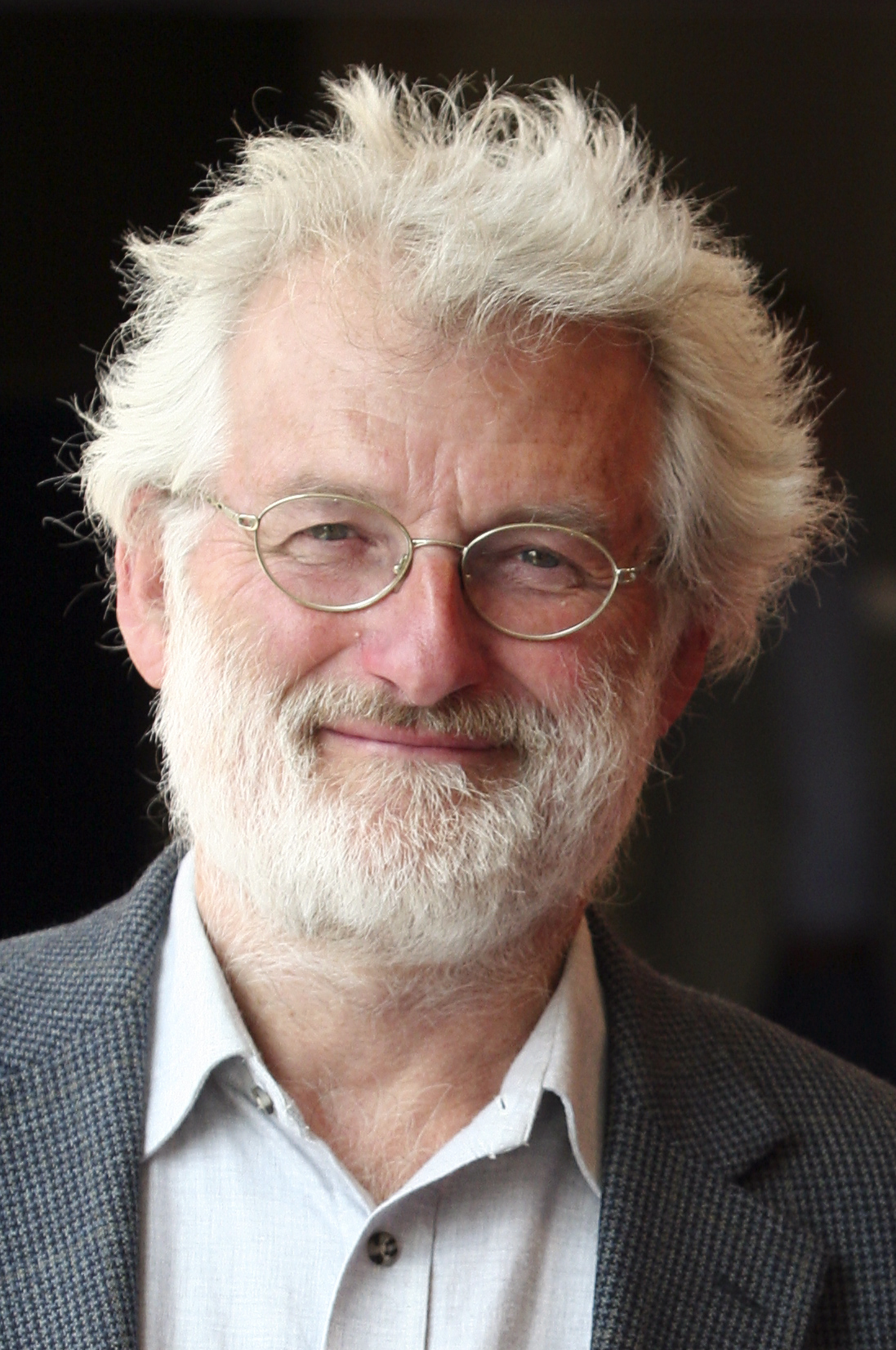
- Sulston in 2008
- Born: John Edward Sulston; 27 March 1942; Fulmer, Buckinghamshire, England
- Died: 6 March 2018 (aged 75)
- Education: Merchant Taylors' School, Northwood
- Alma mater: University of Cambridge (BA, PhD)
- Known for: Genome sequencing of Caenorhabditis elegans and humans Sulston score Apoptosis
- Spouse: Daphne Edith Bate (m. 1966)
- Children: 1 son, 1 daughter
- Awards: W. Alden Spencer Award (1986); Darwin Medal (1996); Beadle Award (2000); Knight Bachelor (2001); Edinburgh Medal (2001); Physiological Society Annual Review Prize Lecture (2002); Nobel prize (2002); Gairdner Award (2002)
- Scientific career
- Fields: Chemistry; Molecular biology
- Workplaces: Wellcome Trust Sanger Institute; University of Cambridge; Salk Institute; Laboratory of Molecular Biology; University of Manchester
- Thesis: Aspects of oligoribonucleotide synthesis (1966)
- Doctoral advisor: Colin Reese
- Website: sanger.ac.uk/people/faculty/honorary-faculty/john-sulston

Sir John Edward Sulston CH FRS MAE (27 March 1942 – 6 March 2018) was a British biologist and academic who won the Nobel Prize in Physiology or Medicine for his work on the cell lineage and genome of the worm Caenorhabditis elegans in 2002 with his colleagues Sydney Brenner and Robert Horvitz at the MRC Laboratory of Molecular Biology. He was a leader in human genome research and Chair of the Institute for Science, Ethics and Innovation at the University of Manchester. Sulston was in favour of science in the public interest, such as free public access of scientific information and against the patenting of genes and the privatisation of genetic technologies.

== Early life and education ==
Sulston was born in Fulmer, Buckinghamshire, England to Arthur Edward Aubrey Sulston and Josephine Muriel Frearson, née Blocksidge. His father was an Anglican priest and administrator of the Society for the Propagation of the Gospel. His mother quit her job as an English teacher at Watford Grammar School, to care for him and his sister Madeleine. and home-tutored them until he was five. At age five he entered the local preparatory school, York House School, where he soon developed an aversion to games. He developed an early interest in science, having fun with dissecting animals and sectioning plants to observe their structure and function. Sulston won a scholarship to Merchant Taylors' School, Northwood and then to Pembroke College, Cambridge graduating in 1963 with a Bachelor of Arts degree in Natural Sciences (Chemistry). He joined the Department of Chemistry, University of Cambridge, after being interviewed by Alexander Todd and was awarded his PhD in 1966 for research in nucleotide chemistry.

== Career ==
Between 1966 and 1969 he worked as a postdoctoral researcher at the Salk Institute for Biological Studies in La Jolla, California. His academic advisor Colin Reese had arranged for him to work with Leslie Orgel, who would turn his scientific career onto a different pathway. Orgel introduced him to Francis Crick and Sydney Brenner, who worked in Cambridge. He became inclined to biological research.

Although Orgel wanted Sulston to remain with him, Sydney Brenner persuaded Sulston to return to Cambridge to work on the neurobiology of Caenorhabditis elegans at the Medical Research Council (MRC) Laboratory of Molecular Biology (LMB). Sulston soon produced the complete map of the worm's neurons. He continued work on its DNA and subsequently the whole genome sequencing. In 1998, the whole genome sequence was published in collaboration with the Genome Institute at Washington University in St. Louis, so that C. elegans became the first animal to have its complete genome sequenced.

Sulston played a central role in both the C. elegans and human genome sequencing projects. He had argued successfully for the sequencing of C. elegans to show that large-scale genome sequencing projects were feasible. As sequencing of the worm genome proceeded, the Human Genome Project began. At this point he was made director of the newly established Sanger Centre (named after Fred Sanger), located in Cambridgeshire, England.

In 2000, after the 'working draft' of the human genome sequence was completed, Sulston retired from directing the Sanger Centre. With Georgina Ferry, he narrated his research career leading to the human genome sequence in The Common Thread: A Story of Science, Politics, Ethics, and the Human Genome (2002).

=== Awards and honours ===
Sulston was elected a Fellow of the Royal Society (FRS) in 1986. His certificate of election reads:

John Sulston is distinguished for his work on the molecular and developmental genetics of Caenorhabditis elegans. His initial research was in the field of chemical synthesis of oligonucleotides. Sulston began his work on C. elegans in 1974 characterising its DNA. Since then he has carried out a wide range of genetical and developmental studies on the nematode but his major research has been on the developmental lineage and mutations that affect it. In a series of studies, culminating in a paper published in 1983, Sulston has analysed and described the total cell lineage of the nematode making it the first organism for which the origin of every cell is exactly known. This work is the basis for the study of mutations affecting lineages and is the foundation on which detailed studies of development in this organism will be based. Sulston has now turned his attention to an analysis of the genome of C. elegans and was constructing a total physical map using a novel method of analysing cloned DNA fragments.

He was awarded W. Alden Spencer Award from Columbia University in 1986. He was elected an EMBO Member in 1989 and awarded the George W. Beadle Award in 2000. In 2001 Sulston gave the Royal Institution Christmas Lectures on The Secrets of Life. In 2002, he won the Dan David Prize and the Robert Burns Humanitarian Award. Later, he shared the Nobel Prize in Physiology or Medicine with Sydney Brenner and Robert Horvitz, both of whom he had collaborated with at the MRC Laboratory of Molecular Biology (LMB), for their discoveries concerning 'genetic regulation of organ development and programmed cell death'.

One of Sulston's most important contributions during his research years at the LMB was to elucidate the precise order in which cells in C. elegans divide. In fact, he and his team succeeded in tracing the nematode's entire embryonic cell lineage.

In 2004, Sulston received the Golden Plate Award of the American Academy of Achievement. In 2006, he was awarded the George Dawson Prize in Genetics by Trinity College Dublin. In 2013, Sulston was awarded the Royal Society of New Zealand's Rutherford Memorial Lecture, which he gave on the subject of population pressure.

He was appointed a Member of the Order of the Companions of Honour (CH) in the 2017 Birthday Honours for services to science and society.

On 23 October 2017 he was awarded the Cambridge Chemistry Alumni Medal.

Sulston was a leading campaigner against the patenting of human genetic information.

== Personal life ==
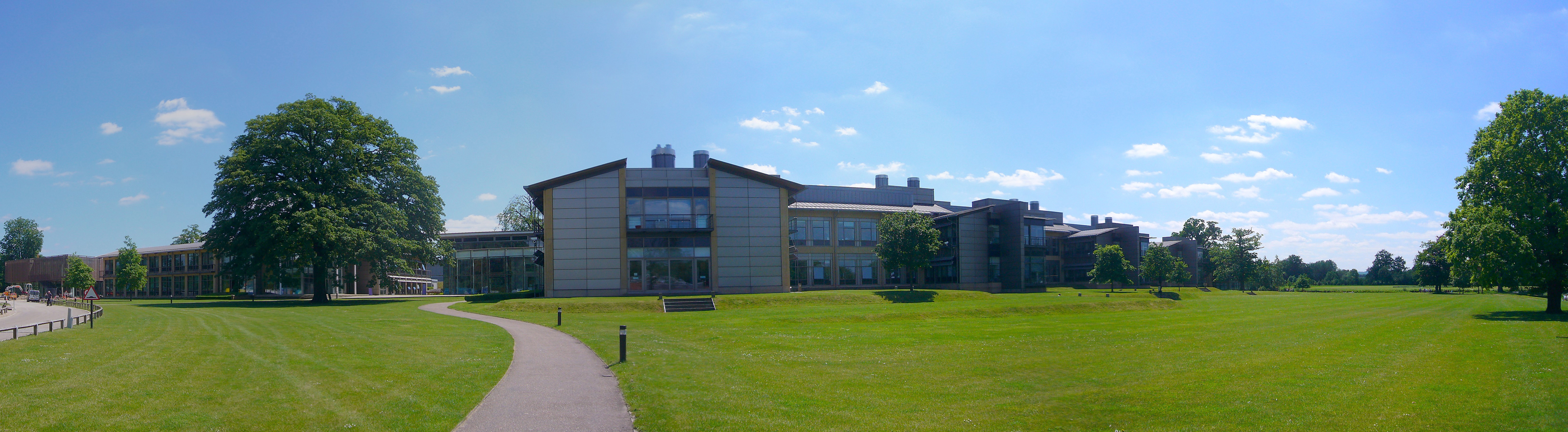
The Sulston Laboratories of the Wellcome Trust Sanger Institute are named in Sulston's honour.

John Sulston met Daphne Bate, a research assistant in Cambridge. They got married in 1966 just before they left for US for postdoctoral research. Together they had two children. Their first child, Ingrid, was born in La Jolla in 1967, and their second, Adrian, later in England. The couple lived in Stapleford, Cambridgeshire where they were active members of the local community: John regularly volunteered in the local library and in working parties at Magog Down; he was a Trustee of Cambridge Past, Present and Future.

Although brought up in a Christian family, Sulston lost his faith during his student life at Cambridge, and remained an atheist. He was a distinguished supporter of Humanists UK. In 2003 he was one of 22 Nobel Laureates who signed the Humanist Manifesto.

Sulston was in favour of free public access of scientific information. He wanted genome information freely available, and he described as "totally immoral and disgusting" the idea of profiteering from such research. He also wanted to change patent law, and argued that restrictions on drugs such as the anti-viral drug Tamiflu by Roche are a hindrance to patients whose lives are dependent on them.

In December 2010, Sulston backed Julian Assange by acting as a bail surety for him, according to Assange's attorney Mark Stephens. Sulston forfeited £15,000 of the £20,000 pledged in June 2012, as Assange had entered the embassy of Ecuador to escape the jurisdiction of the English courts.

Sulston died on 6 March 2018 of stomach cancer, aged 75 years.

Non-profit organization positions
Preceded by –	Director of the Sanger Institute; 1993–2000	Succeeded by Allan Bradley
