= Vardit Ravitsky =

Bioethicist, researcher, and author

- Born: Jerusalem, Israel
- Occupations: Bioethicist, researcher, author
- Title: President and CEO of The Hastings Center for Bioethics
- Awards: Fellow, Canadian Academy of Health Sciences; Fellow, Pierre Elliott Trudeau Foundation; Fellow, Hastings Center for Bioethics

Academic background
- Education: B.A., Philosophy, Sorbonne University, France; M.A., Philosophy, University of New Mexico, USA; Ph.D., Philosophy, Bar-Ilan University, Israel
- Thesis: Genetic Intervention and the Shaping of Human Identity

Academic work
- Institutions: Department of Medical Ethics, School of Medicine, University of Pennsylvania, USA (2005-2008); Department of Social and Preventive Medicine, School of Public Health, University of Montreal (2009 – present); Harvard Medical School, Harvard University (2021-present)

Vardit Ravitsky, an Israeli-Canadian bioethicist, researcher, and author. She is president and CEO of The Hastings Center for Bioethics, a senior lecturer on Global Health and Social Medicine at Harvard Medical School, and past president of the International Association of Bioethics. In 2026, she was elected a member of the National Academy of Medicine (NAM). She is a Fellow of the Pierre Elliott Trudeau Foundation, where she chaired the COVID-19 Impact Committee. She is also a Fellow of The Hastings Center for Bioethics and of the Canadian Academy of Health Sciences. Previously, she was a full professor at the University of Montreal, and director of Ethics and Health at the Center for Research on Ethics.

== Education ==
Ravitsky holds a bachelor's degree in philosophy from the Sorbonne University in Paris, France and a master's degree in philosophy from the University of New Mexico in Albuquerque, USA. In 2004, she completed her Ph.D. in philosophy with a specialization in Bioethics at Bar-Ilan University in Israel. From 2003 to 2005 Ravitsky was a Post-Doctoral Fellow at the Department of Clinical Bioethics of the National Institutes of Health and at the Social and Behavioral Research Branch of the National Human Genome Research Institute in Bethesda, Maryland, USA.

== Career ==
Ravitsky was a researcher at the Unit for Health Rights and Ethics of the Gertner Institute for Epidemiology and Health Policy Research in Israel (2001-2003). In 2005, she accepted a position as assistant professor at Department of Medical Ethics in the School of Medicine of the University of Pennsylvania. In 2009, she joined the University of Montreal as an assistant professor. She was promoted to associate professor in 2014 and to Full Professor in 2020.

Ravitsky served as a Consultant to Genome Canada (2006-2008), assisting in the development of its GE3LS research program (Genomics and its ethical, environmental, economic, legal, and social implications). From 2008 to 2009 she was senior policy advisor at the Ethics Office of the Canadian Institutes of Health Research (CIHR). In 2018, she was appointed board member of the Canadian Philosophical Association and member of the Genomics & Society Working Group of the National Human Genome Research Institute (NHGRI). In 2020, she was featured by Genome Canada as a leading Canadian researcher in the area of ethical, social, and policy implications of genomics.

== Research ==
=== Donor conception ===
Ravitsky has written about the potential medical and psycho-social issues facing individuals born from gamete (sperm and egg) donation. She argued that their interests to have access to information about their genetic origins should be recognized. She also explored the implications of these interests in the context of cross-border assisted reproduction, where gametes and prospective parents may come from different countries.

=== Infertility and assisted reproductive technologies ===
Ravitsky's research explores various aspects of assisted reproductive technologies (ART). She studied the need for a public health approach to infertility prevention, particularly in the context of advanced maternal age and in the area of male infertility. She analyzed ethical issues related to fertility preservation in pediatric cancer patients, such as prepubescent girls and adolescents. She also studied issues related to post-humous reproduction, such as consent to the use of leftover embryos from In-Vitro Fertilization (IVF) or factors influencing decision-making regarding the post-humous use of sperm. She studied ethical issues related to access to IVF of women with mental illness and to possible epigenetic risks of IVF.

=== Prenatal testing ===
In 2009, Ravitsky started exploring the socio-ethical aspects of Non-Invasive Prenatal Testing (NIPT), also known as prenatal cell-free DNA testing. She published a paper in Nature Reviews Genetics, arguing that NIPT ought to be implemented without delay due to its potential benefit for pregnant women. In 2011, she participated in the first international workshop on the ethics of NIPT and in 2015 she co-organized an international workshop, exploring NIPT in the Non-Western Context, as well as a workshop at the International Society for Prenatal Diagnosis‘ International Conference, in which patients’ advocates discussed the impact of NIPT on their families and communities.

Since 2013, Ravitsky has co-led the pan-Canadian research project PEGASUS that explores the responsible implementation of NIPT in the Canadian context. She leads a team of researchers studying the ethical, social, and policy issues associated with NIPT, with a focus on the reproductive autonomy of pregnant people and the need to address disability rights when implementing a new prenatal testing technology. She published extensively on these topics. In 2017, she published a paper proposing a conceptual framework for the ethical analysis of NIPT, based on the tension between women's reproductive autonomy and a public health approach to prenatal testing. In 2021 she led the publication of a paper on the emergence and global spread of NIPT.

=== Genetics and genomics ===
Ravitsky has explored various ethical and legal challenges associated with genetic research and genomics-based technologies. In 2006, she published a paper proposing a framework for the disclosure of individual genetic results to research participants. The paper was selected by Essential Science Indicators from Thomson Reuters as the most-cited paper of 2016 in the research area of Social Sciences. It was also named one of the top 5 most cited papers ever published by the American Journal of Bioethics.

She wrote about the ethical and conceptual challenges emerging from epigenetics and about the clinical implementation of Preimplantation Genetic Testing. Her research addresses ethical and policy issues emerging from germline gene editing and mitochondrial replacement therapy. She is member of a group that has explored the need to revise Canadian policy, in particular Canada's 2004 Assisted Human Reproduction Act, to allow research on human embryos using these technologies. In 2022, Ravitsky won competitive NIH grants to co-lead the ethics module of 2 large data-generation projects (one on cell mapping and the other on voice as a biomarker), funded within the Bridge2AI program that seeks to promote health research based on Artificial Intelligence and Machine Learning.

=== End of life and cultural perspectives ===
In 2000, Ravitsky was appointed by the Israeli Minister of Health to an expert committee tasked with drafting legislation that would address end-of-life care of dying patients in Israel. The work of the committee resulted in the Dying Patient Law of 2005, that Ravitsky translated to English and has written several papers about. Her work explores the Jewish cultural approach to end-of-life care and the way in which cultural values shape bioethical and policy debates in various societies. She also wrote about the role culture plays in the context of genomics, for example in relation to cloning and gene editing.

== Awards and honors ==
- 2017 – Researcher Knowledge Mobilization Award, Quebec Reproduction Network
- 2018 – Board member, Canadian Philosophical Association (CPA)
- 2020 – Fellow of the Canadian Academy of Health Sciences
- 2020 – Chair of the COVID-19 Impact Committee, Pierre Elliott Trudeau Foundation
- 2020 – Fellow of the Pierre Elliott Trudeau Foundation
- 2020 – Fellow of the Hastings Center
- 2026 – Elected Member of the National Academy of Medicine

== Bibliography ==
=== Books ===
- Public Discourse on Agri-Biotech and GMO in Israel (2003)
- The Penn Center Guide to Bioethics. (2009)

=== Selected articles ===
- Vardit Ravitsky & Marie-Christine Roy (first authors), Hazar Haidar, Lidewij Henneman, John Marshall, Ainsley J. Newson, Olivia M.Y. Ngan, & Tamar Nov-Klaiman. The emergence and global spread of non-Invasive Prenatal Testing. Annual Review of Genomics and Human Genetics, 22(1), 309-338, 2021.
- I. Glenn Cohen, Eli Y. Adashi & Vardit Ravitsky. "How bans on germline editing deprive patients with mitochondrial disease". Nature Biotechnology 37: 589–592, 2019.
- Vardit Ravitsky. "The Shifting Landscape of Prenatal Testing: Between Reproductive Autonomy and Public Health". Hastings Center Report, 47 (6): S34-S40. Nov-Dec 2017.
- Ravitsky Vardit. "'Knowing where you come from': The Rights of Donor-Conceived Individuals and the Meaning of Genetic Relatedness". Minnesota Journal of Law Science & Technology, 11(2): 655–684. 2010.
- Ravitsky Vardit & Wilfond Benjamin S. "Disclosing Individual Genetic Results to Research Participants". American Journal of Bioethics - Target Article. Nov-Dec; 6(6): pp. 8–17. 2006.
- Ravitsky Vardit. "Timers on Ventilators". British Medical Journal, Vol. 330, pp. 415–417. 2005
