= Institute for Science, Ethics and Innovation =

Research institute in Manchester, UK

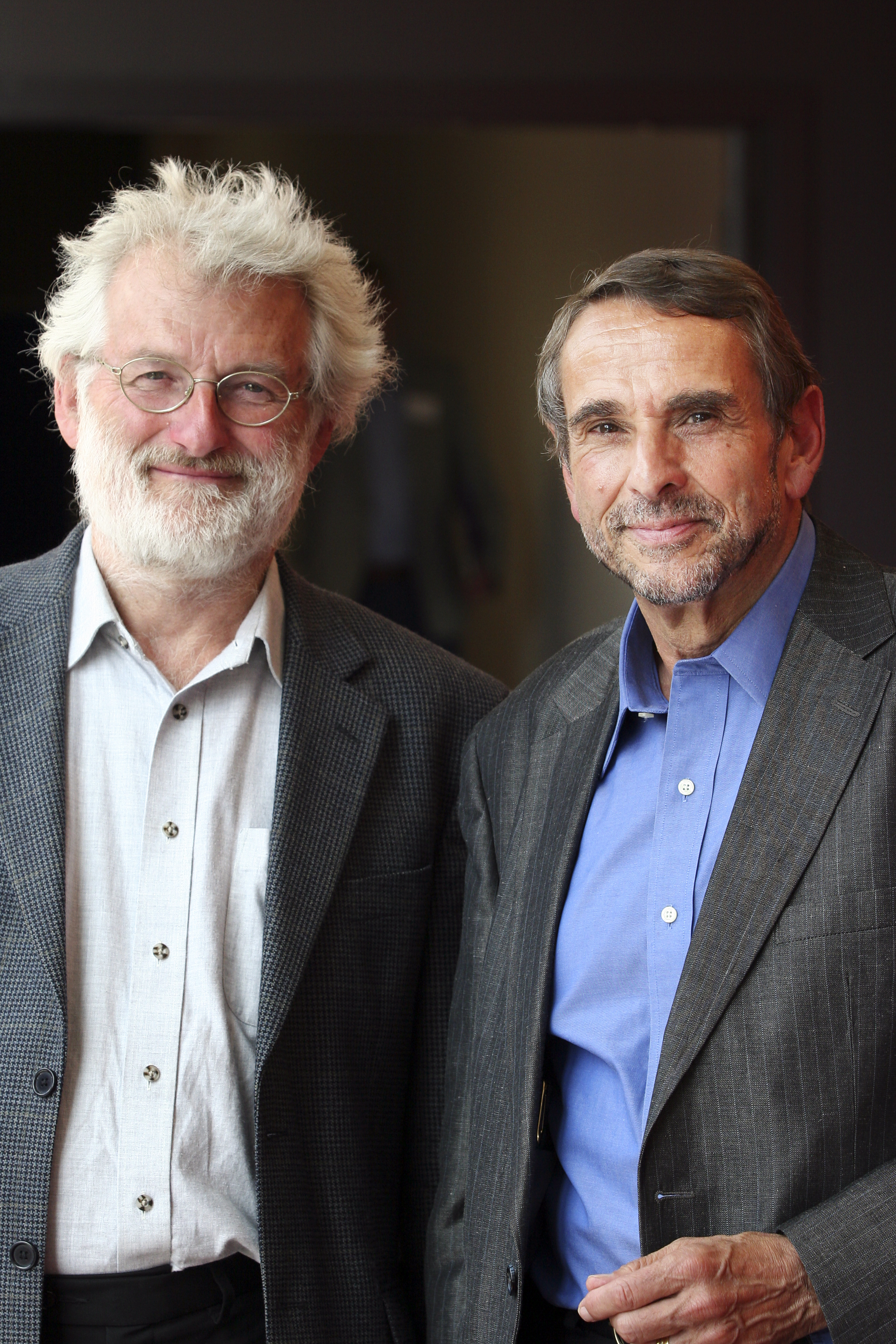
- John Sulston and John Harris, Chair and Director of the Institute for Science, Ethics and Innovation
- Chair: John Sulston
- Key people: John Sulston, John Harris
- Location: Manchester, United Kingdom
- Website: http://www.isei.manchester.ac.uk

The Institute for Science, Ethics and Innovation (iSEI) is a research institute founded at the University of Manchester in 2007 with a mission to examine the role and moral responsibilities of science, technology and innovation in the contemporary world. Chaired by the Nobel laureate John Sulston (formerly the founding director of the Sanger Institute) and directed by the bioethicist John Harris, iSEI performs multi-disciplinary research across four broad areas: What is Science For? Who Owns Science? How Should Science be Used? and the Ethics of Emerging Technologies.

Funded by a Wellcome Trust Biomedical Ethics Strategic Award, iSEI has embarked on a 5-year research programme on ‘The Human Body: Its Scope, Limits and Future’, starting in 2009. This work will follow five strands within iSEI's existing research portfolio: • Human Biomaterials • Genethics • Reproduction • Enhancement • Methods in Bioethics

== Publications ==
=== The Manchester Manifesto ===
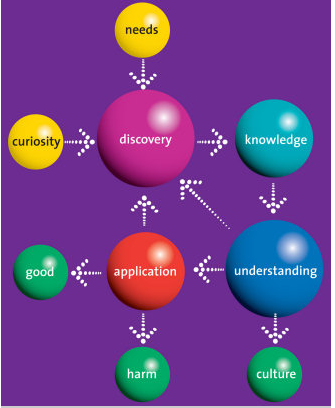
The Manchester Manifesto.

In 2009, the Institute for Science, Ethics and Innovation published the Manchester Manifesto, the signatories of which include Nobel laureates Joseph Stiglitz (also director of Brooks World Poverty Institute), John Sulston. The manifesto raised questions about the ownership of science and the rationale for strict intellectual property rights and was widely reported in the British media, with articles in the Financial Times, The Times, The Guardian accompanied by interviews of the Nobel duo in the BBC's Today programme. The Chartered Institute of Patent Attorneys welcomed aspects of the manifesto, but criticised the authors views as being "ill-informed and misleading", leading the authors to respond "it was not the purpose of the Manchester Manifesto to abolish intellectual property, nor yet its governance by laws; but to bring these far more into line with the public interest."
