= Willard Gaylin =

American bioethicist (1925–2022)

- Born: February 23, 1925; Cleveland, Ohio, U.S.
- Died: December 30, 2022 (aged 97); Valhalla, New York, U.S.
- Education: Harvard College, Case Western Reserve University School of Medicine

Willard Marvin Gaylin (February 23, 1925 – December 30, 2022) was an American bioethicist and physician who served as a clinical professor of psychiatry at Columbia College of Physicians and Surgeons. He was also the co-founder, along with Daniel Callahan, of The Hastings Center, an independent research institute focused on bioethics. Gaylin served as the president of the Hastings Center from its inception, in 1969, until 1993 and as chairman of the board from 1993 to 1994. He was a member of the Center's board.

== Biography ==
Born in Cleveland, Ohio, Gaylin received his B.A. from Harvard College in 1947 and his M.D. from Case Western Reserve University School of Medicine in 1951. He went on to earn a Certificate in Psychoanalytic Education from the Columbia University Center for Psychoanalytic Training and Research. For some 30 years he served on its faculty as a training and supervising psychoanalyst. From 1970 to 1980 he simultaneously served as Professor of Psychiatry at Columbia Medical School, Professor of Psychiatry and Law at Columbia Law School and adjunct professor at Union Theological Seminary. He was Clinical Professor of Psychiatry Emeritus at Columbia College of Physicians and Surgeons.

Among other awards and honors, he received the George E. Daniels Medal for contributions to psychoanalytic medicine, the Van Gieson Award for outstanding contributions to the mental health sciences, was named Elizabeth Cutter Morrow Lecturer at Smith College, Bloomfield Lecturer at Case Western Reserve Medical School, Sandor Rado Lecturer at Columbia Psychoanalytic Center, a Chubb Fellow at Yale, Visiting Professor at Harvard Medical School, and received the prestigious Henry Beecher Award for Life-Achievement in Bioethics. He has served on the boards of directors of the Planned Parenthood Federation of America, Helsinki Watch, Medical/ Scientific Board of the National Aphasia Association, and was the first chairman of the Human Rights Task Force of the American Psychiatric Association and was a member of the Human Rights Committee of the Institute of Medicine. Gaylin had been a participant in the Fred Friendly Columbia University Seminars on Media and Society since its inception. He has been on panels discussing "Professional Ethics, Medical Ethics," and the "Bill of Rights." The 1981 KCTS/TV series, "Hard Choices," for which he was the narrator, received an Alfred I DuPont/Columbia Broadcast Award for excellence in TV journalism.

Gaylin died on December 30, 2022, at the age of 97.

== In popular culture ==
Gaylin is quoted in the opening credits of the film Gattaca: "I not only think that we will tamper with Mother Nature, I think Mother wants us to."

== Selected bibliography ==
Gaylin, Willard. The Rage Within. Pip Enterprises, Inc., 1984.

‌Gaylin, Willard. "Try A Little Romance". The New York Times, March 29, 1987.
