= Survival lottery =

Thought experiment in ethics

The survival lottery is a thought experiment, proposed by the philosopher John Harris. The basis of the idea is to ask people to imagine if organ donation were expected to save more individuals than it would kill. Hypothetically all individuals are assigned a number and drawn out of lottery when a donation is needed, and are expected to give up their lives to allow two or more people to live.

== Arguments for ==
The argument for the survival lottery can be as follows:

1. Imagine that organ donation was perfect.
2. There is no difference between killing and letting die.
3. Given 1 and 2 we should adopt the survival lottery.

The article is a direct challenge to the belief that there is a difference between killing and letting die, and an exploration of the moral consequences that follow from this.

== Assumptions the "survival lottery" relies on ==
The survival lottery relies on the following assumptions:

1. Each life (killed or allowed to die naturally) is of equal value.
2. Two lives saved are of more value than one life killed to save them.
3. Two lives saved would be completely cured, or be sufficiently cured as to show a quality of two lives greater than a healthy life killed to save them.
4. Two lives saved would be able to live long enough on the transplanted organs (staving off rejection and the original sickness causing their need for replacement) as to show a quantitative gain over a completely healthy (and presumable longer) life randomly chosen to be killed.

== Arguments against ==
One or more of these assumptions can be proven false and disarm the survival lottery thought experiment by proving that while killing and letting die can be determined as equal (hypothetically), the actual lives involved cannot be determined as equal, nor that multiple lives saved are greater than one life lost.

== Sources ==
- "The Survival Lottery" by John Harris in Applied Ethics: Oxford Readings in Philosophy (1986), ed. Peter Singer
- John Harris (1975). "The survival lottery." Philosophy, 50: 81–87.
