= Nicholas Agar =

New Zealand professor of ethics (born 1965)

Nicholas Agar (born 1965) is a New Zealand professor of ethics. Agar has a BA from the University of Auckland, an MA from the Victoria University of Wellington, and a PhD from the Australian National University. He has been teaching at the University of Waikato since 2022.

== Work on human enhancement ==
Agar has written extensively on the ethics of human enhancement and eugenics. He wrote the 2004 book Liberal Eugenics: In Defence of Human Enhancement, in which he argued that a vigorous defense of procreative freedom could turn authoritarian eugenics into a morally defensible liberal eugenics. Agar argued that parents should be allowed to make genetic modifications to their children, as long these changes do not excessively limit the child’s ability to shape their own future. He believes that state interference should be minimal, except for banning harmful modifications.

Agar's 2010 book Humanity's End argued against the doctrine of radical enhancement sometimes identified with the transhumanist movement. Agar claims that enhancement is a good thing that it is nevertheless possible to overdo. He advances a species-relativist view about the value of human experiences and achievements.

In his 2013 book Truly Human Enhancement Agar defines "transformative change" as altering "the state of an individual's mental or physical characteristics in a way that causes and warrants a significant change in how that individual evaluates a wide range of their own experiences, beliefs, or achievements." He uses the movie Invasion of the Body Snatchers to illustrate transformative changes that we correctly predict we may endorse once we have undergone them but that conflict with our prudential values. In the film, humans are replaced by alien beings who share their memories and identities yet lack individual survival instincts and emotional depth. Similarly, Agar argues that, while we might anticipate contentment post-transformation, we may wisely reject radical enhancements, as they risk erasing essential qualities that define our humanity.

== Work on technological change ==
In the 2015 book The Sceptical Optimist: Why Technology Isn't the Answer to Everything Agar challenges the view that great things will come from technological progress that will lead human flourishing. He describes a phenomenon called "hedonic normalization" that Agar claims leads us to significantly overestimate the power of technological progress to improve our well-being. According to Agar, we overlook hedonic normalization when we suppose that because we would be unhappy to find ourselves permanently transported back in time to the middle ages that people living back them must have been miserable too. The same distortions apply when we imagine a future with cures for cancer and colonies on Mars. Technological progress may make us happier but not nearly so much as we imagine it. Agar discusses the implications this has for our collective prioritization of technological progress.

In a 2019 book How to be Human in the Digital Economy Agar addresses challenges posed by automation and artificial intelligence to human work and agency. Agar argues for a hybrid "social-digital economy". The key value of the digital economy is efficiency. The key value of the social economy is humanness. A social economy would be centered on connections between human minds. Agar argues that we should reject some digital automation because machines will always be poor substitutes for humans in roles that involve direct contact with other humans. In a hybrid social-digital economy, people do the jobs for which feelings matter and machines take on data-intensive work.

== Books ==
- How to Think about Progress: A Skeptic's Guide to Technology co-written with Stuart Whatley and Dan Weijers (Springer, 2024)
- Dialogues on Human Enhancement (Routledge, 2024)
- How to be Human in the Digital Economy (MIT Press, 2019)
- The Sceptical Optimist: Why technology isn't the answer to everything (Oxford University Press, 2015)
- Truly Human Enhancement: A Philosophical Defense of Limits (MIT Press, 2013)
- Humanity's End: Why We Should Reject Radical Enhancement (MIT Press, 2010)
- Liberal Eugenics: In Defence of Human Enhancement (Wiley Blackwell, 2004)
- Perfect Copy (Icon, 2002)
- Life's Intrinsic Value (Columbia University Press, 2001)
