= Hastings Center for Bioethics =

American nonprofit bioethics research institute

The Hastings Center for Bioethics
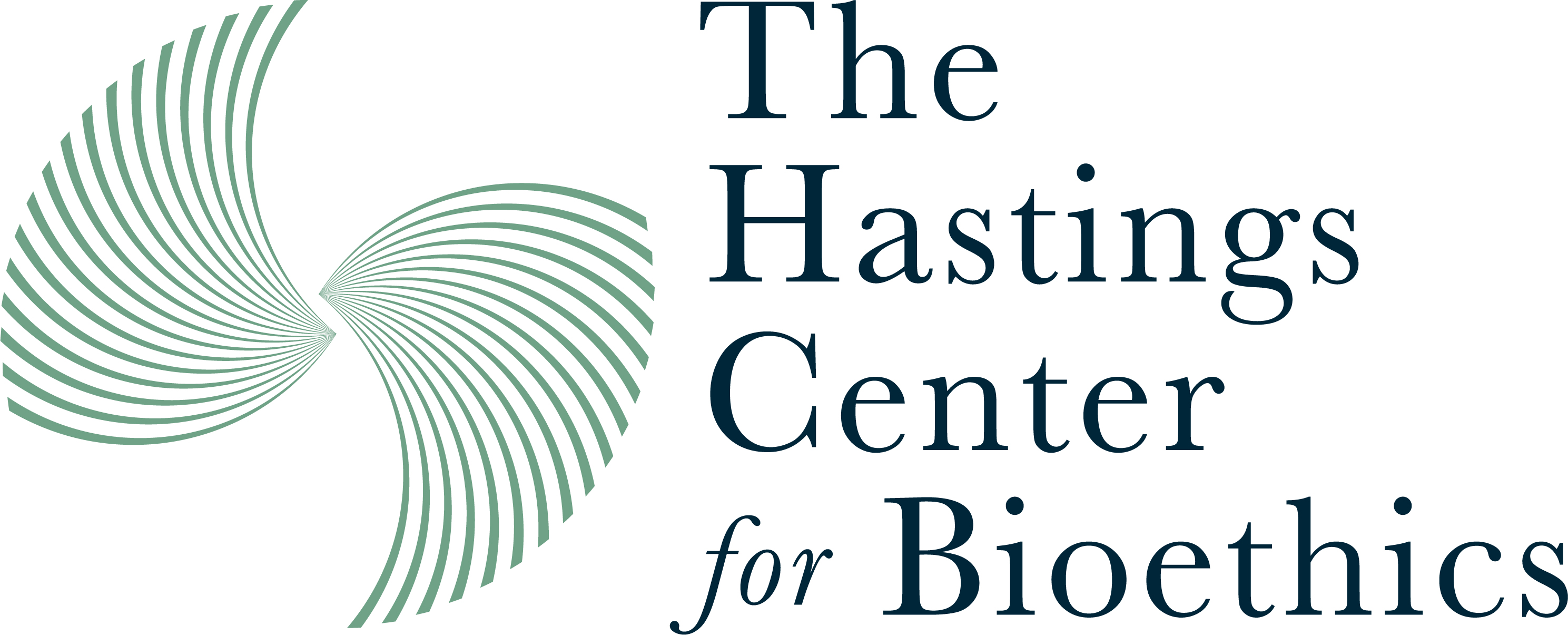

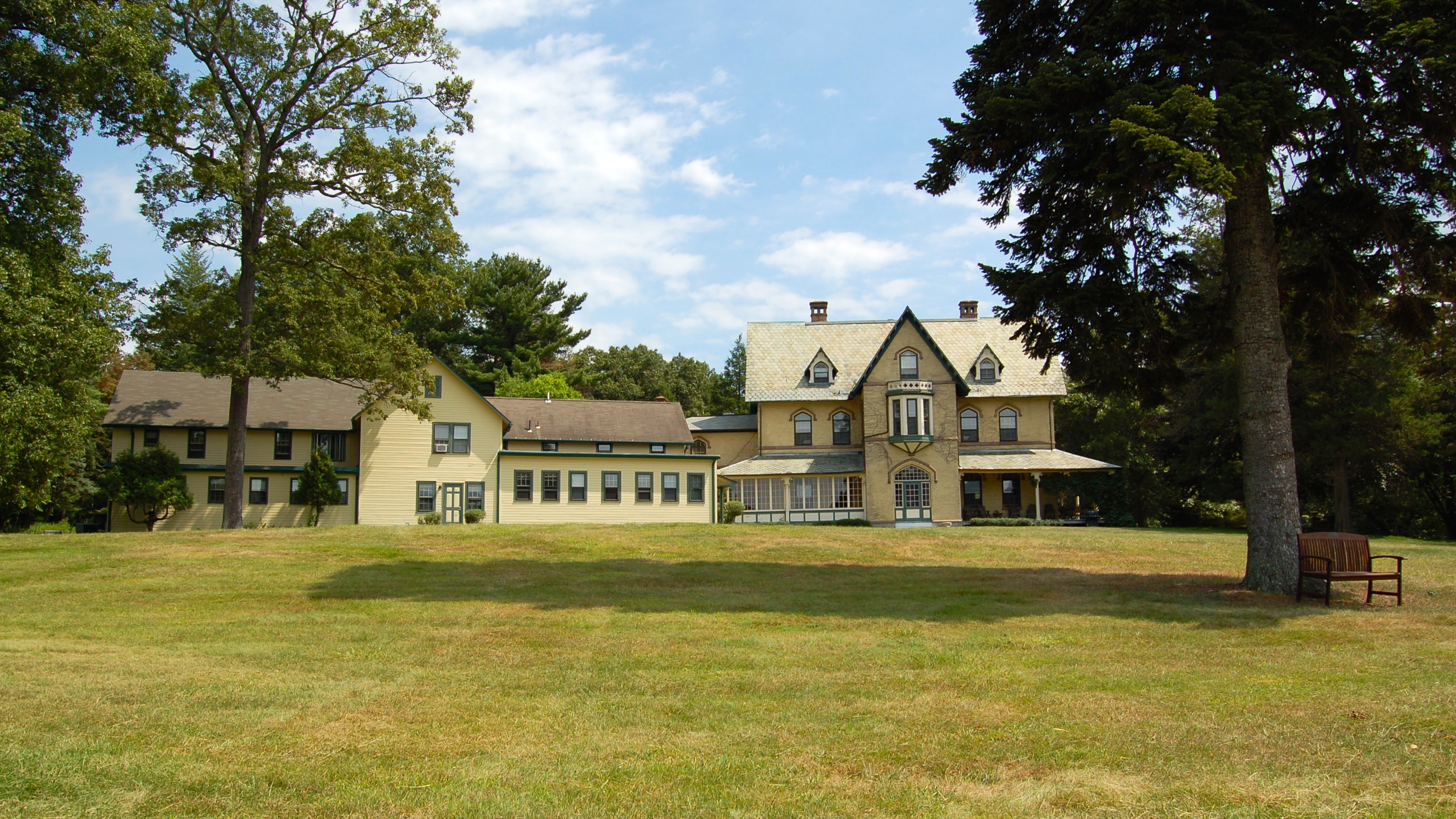
- Woodlawn, the Center's headquarters
- Formation: 1969
- Type: Bioethics research institute
- Location: Garrison, New York, U.S.
- President: Vardit Ravitsky
- Revenue: $5,728,536 (2025)
- Expenses: $5,145,573 (2025)
- Website: www.thehastingscenter.org

The Hastings Center for Bioethics is an independent, nonpartisan bioethics research institute in Garrison, New York. It was known as The Hastings Center before 2025.

The Center’s mission is to address social and ethical challenges in medicine, healthcare, science, and technology, to promote wise and responsible implementation. Through its research, publications, educational activities, and public engagement, the Center seeks to promote collaborative deliberation and to foster inclusive and informed conversations among patients and families, healthcare professionals, researchers, policymakers, and the public.

== History ==
The Hastings Center for Bioethics was founded in 1969 by Daniel Callahan and Willard Gaylin as the Institute of Society, Ethics, and the Life Sciences. Established at a time when rapid advances in medicine and biology were raising novel ethical questions, the Center became the first institution devoted to the interdisciplinary study of bioethics. It is widely regarded as one of the institutions that helped establish bioethics as an academic field. Originally located in Hastings-on-Hudson, New York, the Center later moved to Garrison, New York, where it is now headquartered on the former Woodlawn estate, designed by architect Richard Upjohn.

In its early years, the Center identified four principal issues to research: population, including respect for procreative freedom; behavior, which responded to early discoveries about the brain-behavior link and efforts to find ways to modify behaviors and prompted reassessment of what is "normal"; death and dying, including the ongoing controversy over defining death; and ethical issues in human genetics.

== Publications ==
The Hastings Center for Bioethics publishes two peer-reviewed journals, the Hastings Center Report and Ethics & Human Research, six times per year. Founded in 1970, the Hastings Center Report explores the ethical, legal, and social issues in medicine, healthcare, public health, and the life sciences, and periodically includes special reports, many of which are developed through the Center's research projects. Ethics & Human Research aims to foster critical analysis of issues in science and healthcare that have implications for human biomedical and behavioral research, including developments that bring new challenges to existing ethical, regulatory, and policy frameworks governing research with humans in the United States and elsewhere.

Hastings Bioethics Forum is the Center’s online publication featuring commentary on current issues in bioethics. It is designed to be responsive to emerging developments and accessible to the general public.

Bioethics Briefings is the Center’s free online resource covering topics such as abortion, AI in healthcare, brain injury, racism and health equity, organ transplantation, and physician-assisted death. The briefs are written by leading ethicists and are grounded in scientific facts. They are intended for students, teachers, journalists, policymakers, and the general public.

The Hastings Center Bioethics Timeline depicts the history of bioethics. It is intended to be a useful starting point in understanding bioethics—how and when it emerged, the issues it has taken on its scope, and some of its major contributors. The timeline was developed, and is periodically updated, by a committee of Hastings Center Fellows.

== Research ==
Hastings research scholars and their external collaborators help frame and examine critical bioethics issues facing professional practice and public policy. Research is organized around interdisciplinary projects that bring together scholars and practitioners from bioethics, medicine, law, public policy, and related fields. The Center’s methodology and products are the gold standard for rigorous interdisciplinary investigation. Research topics include: emerging and established biotechnologies, health AI, population and community health, aging societies and end of life, disability and human flourishing, clinical ethics and research ethics, and our changing natural environment.

Project findings are published in peer-reviewed journals, special reports and books and disseminated through various public engagement activities. Recent reports include Living with Dementia: Learning from Cultural Narratives of Aging Societies, Envisioning a More Just Genomics, The Ethical Implications of Social and Behavioral Genomics, and A Critical Moment in Bioethics: Reckoning with Anti-Black Racism through Intergenerational Dialogue.

The Hastings Center for Bioethics is home to the Robert S. Morison Library, that provides research resources for Hastings' scholars, fellows, and visitors.

== Impact ==
The Center shapes public discourse on timely issues through its public engagement, public-facing commentaries, webinars, and events. Center scholars have contributed to ethical guidance and public policy on issues such as end-of-life decision-making, research on HIV/AIDS, genomics, AI, and research ethics. The Center’s publications inform clinical practice, professional guidelines, and policy. Examples of real-world impact of the Center’s work include:

- Two editions of The Hastings Center Guidelines for Decisions on Life-Sustaining Treatment and Care Near the End of Life have influenced medical policy and practice. The first edition was the first comprehensive consensus-based ethics guidance on end-of-life care and was cited in the Supreme Court case Cruzan v. Director, Missouri Department of Health.

- Research scholars quickly produced Covid-19 Ethics Frameworks that were used by health organizations during the most challenging stages of the pandemic.

- Scholars have participated in initiatives addressing the ethical governance of AI in healthcare.

- A peer-reviewed article in the Hastings Center Report contributed to changes in federal guidance on informed consent for intimate medical examinations.

Center scholars often provide expert commentary to national news organizations on emerging issues in bioethics, including reproductive medicine, health-related AI, genetics, end-of-life care, xenotransplantation, and environmental health.

== Pathway Programs ==
The Center runs pathway programs for early-career bioethicists and students. The Hastings Center Sadler Scholars are a select group of doctoral students and early-career scholars. The Stavros Niarchos Foundation (SNF) Global Bioethics Mentorship Program is a one-year remote opportunity for project-focused mentorship for early-career bioethics researchers in low- and middle-income regions. The Hastings Center Summer Bioethics Program for Undergraduates is a live online program opportunity for undergraduates interested in bioethics issues and related careers, who have limited opportunities for bioethics training.

== Hastings Center Fellows ==
Hastings Center Fellows are elected for their outstanding contributions to scholarship and public understanding of ethical issues in health, healthcare, life sciences research, and the environment. Fellows participate in Center activities, including publications, educational programs, and initiatives such as the Hastings Bioethics Timeline.

== Awards ==
The Bioethics Founders' Award recognizes those who have made a lifetime contribution to ethics and life sciences.

The Hastings Center Cunniff-Dixon Physician and Nursing Awards recognize doctors and nurses who give exemplary care to patients nearing the end of life.
