= John Harris (bioethicist) =

British bioethicist and philosopher

John Harris FMedSci FRSA FRSB
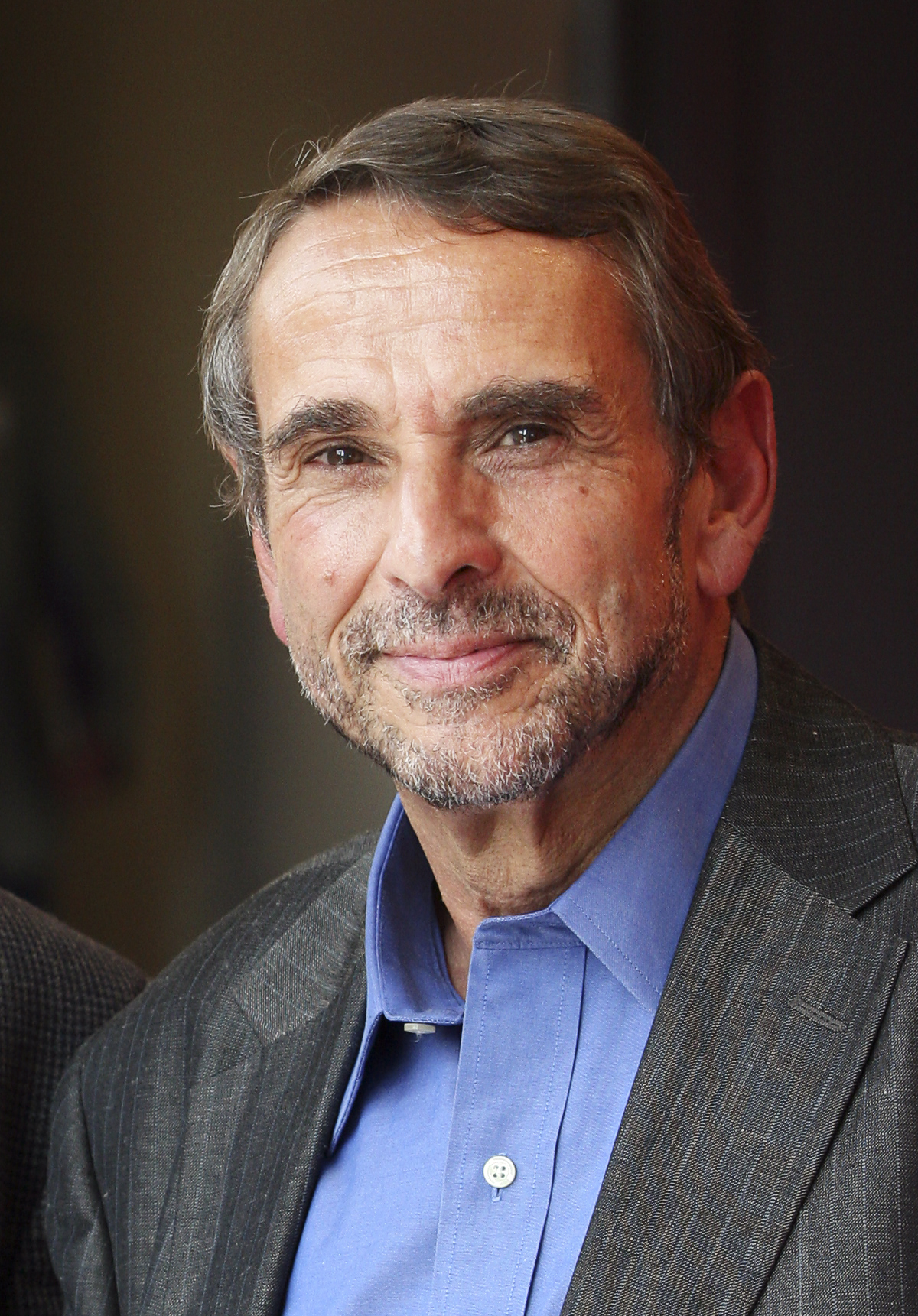
- Harris in 2008
- Born: 21 August 1945 (age 81)
- Education: University of Kent (BA, 1966); Balliol College, Oxford (DPhil, 1976)
- Known for: Survival lottery
- Scientific career
- Fields: Philosophy; Ethics; Bioethics
- Workplaces: University of Manchester; City of Birmingham Polytechnic; Brunel University
- Thesis: Violence and negative actions (1976)
- Website: www.manchester.ac.uk/research/john.harris

John Morley Harris, FMedSci, FRSA, FRSB (born 21 August 1945) is a British bioethicist and philosopher. He is professor emeritus at the University of Manchester and founded the Institute for Science, Ethics and Innovation.

== Education ==
Harris was educated at the University of Kent gaining a Bachelor of Arts degree in 1966 and Balliol College, Oxford where he was awarded a Doctor of Philosophy degree in 1976 from the Faculty of Literae Humaniores.

== Career ==
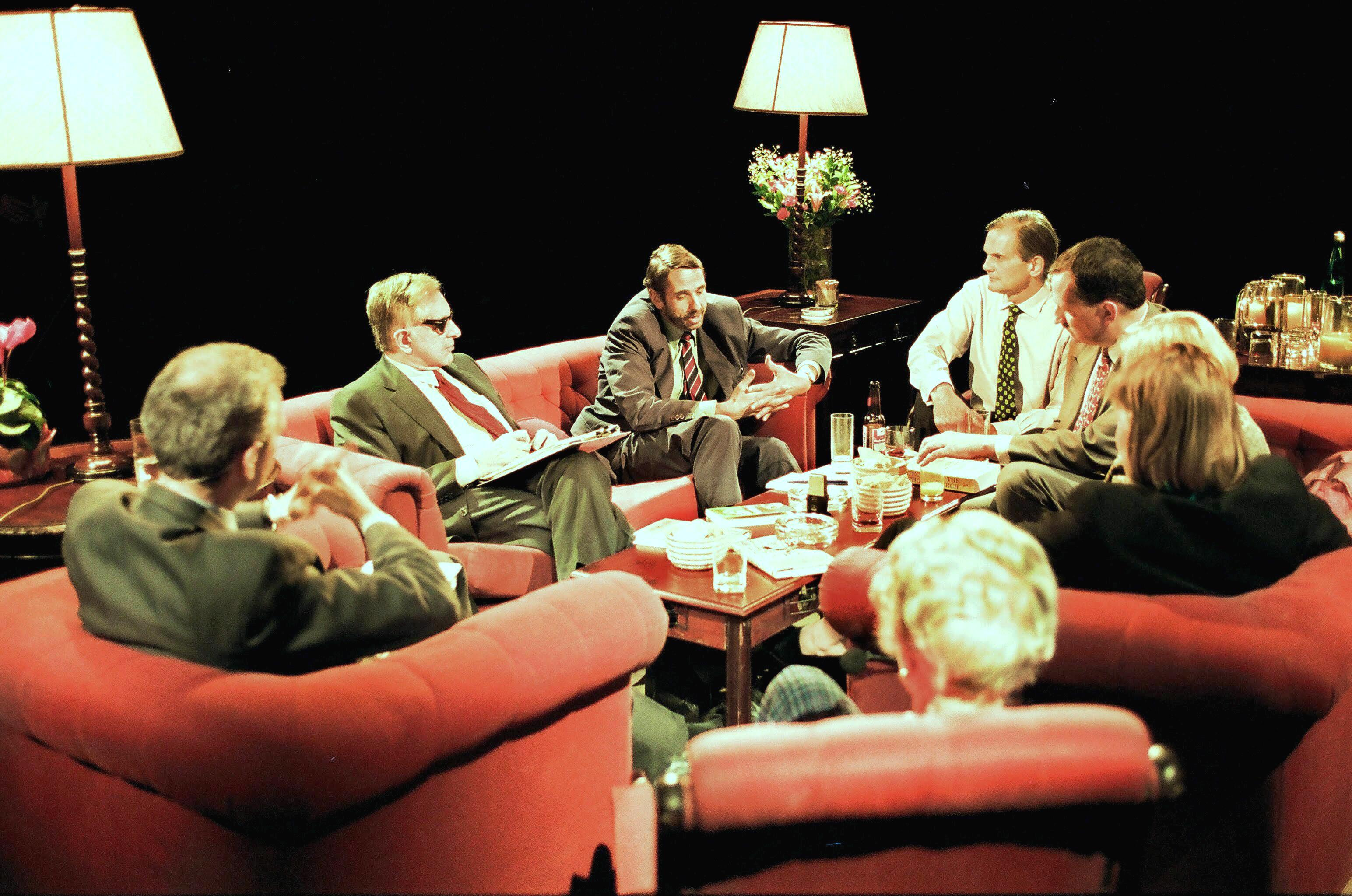
Appearing on After Dark in 1997 with among others Bernard Nathanson (to Harris's right)

Harris was one of the Founder Directors of the International Association of Bioethics and is a founder member of the Board of the journal Bioethics and a member of the editorial board of the Cambridge Quarterly of Healthcare Ethics. He is also the joint Editor-in-Chief of the Journal of Medical Ethics. Throughout his career, he has defended broadly libertarian-consequentialist approaches to issues in bioethics.

== Awards ==
- Fellow of the United Kingdom Academy of Medical Sciences (FMedSci) in 2001, the first philosopher to have been elected to Fellowship of the then new National Academy
- Fellow of The Royal Society of Arts in 2006
- Member of the Romanian Academy of Medical Sciences, 1994
- Medal of the University of Helsinki, 1995
- Honorary Member of The International Forum for Biophilosophy, 2001
- Fellow of The Hastings Centre, 2004
- D.Litt. (honoris causa), University of Kent, 2010
