= Francoise Baylis =

Canadian bioethicist (born 1961)

Francoise Baylis CM ONS FRSC
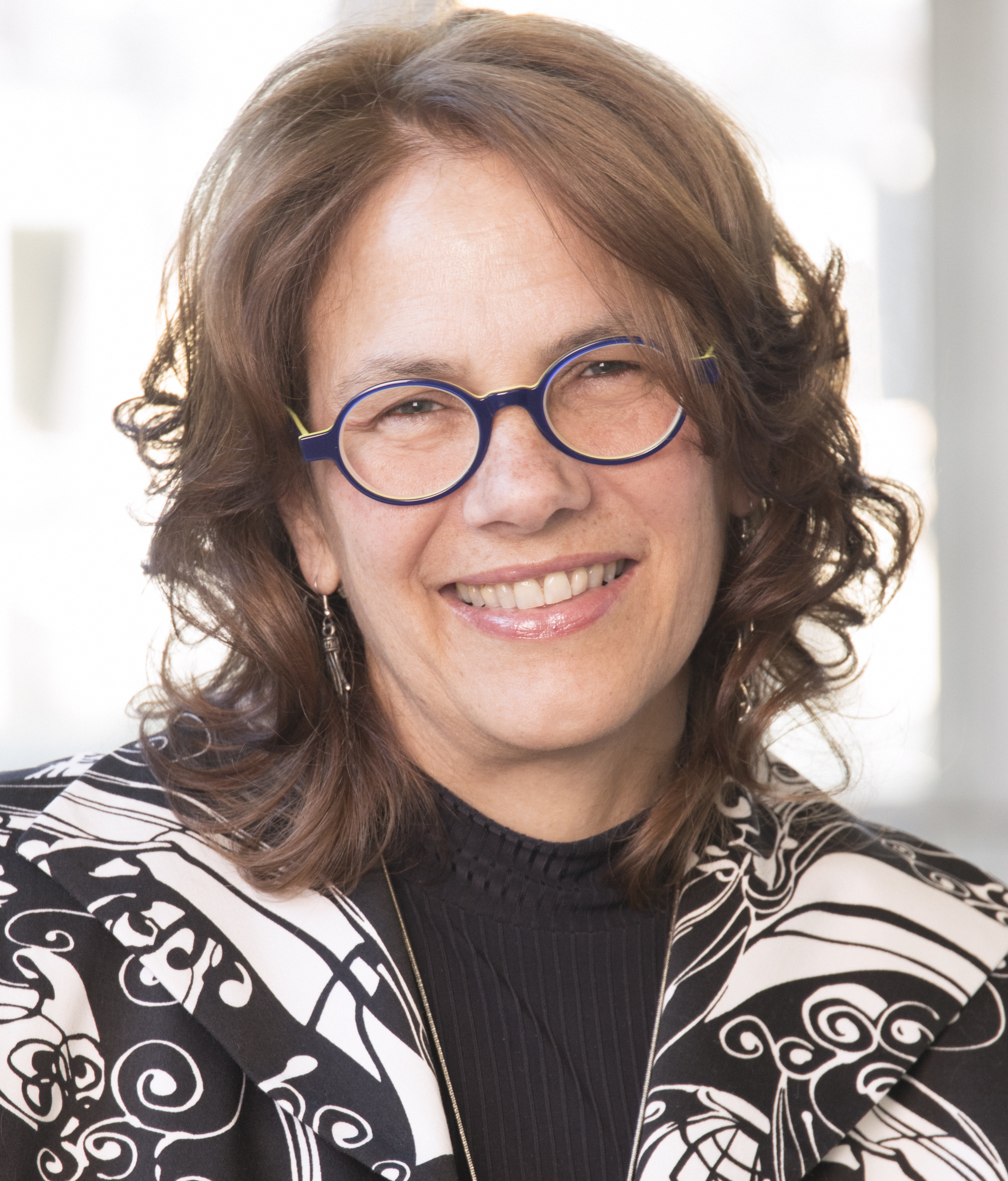
- Born: Françoise Elvina Baylis; 1961 (age 64–65); Montreal, Quebec, Canada

Education
- Education: McGill University, University of Western Ontario

Philosophical work
- Era: Contemporary philosophy
- Region: Western philosophy
- Institutions: University of Tennessee; University of Toronto; Dalhousie University
- Main interests: bioethics, applied ethics, health policy
- Website: francoisebaylis.ca

Françoise Elvina Baylis CM ONS FRSC (born 1961) is a Canadian bioethicist whose work is at the intersection of applied ethics, health policy, and practice. The focus of her research is on issues of women's health and assisted reproductive technologies, but her research and publication record also extend to such topics as research involving humans (including human embryo research), gene editing, novel genetic technologies, public health, the role of bioethics consultants, and neuroethics. Baylis' interest in the impact of bioethics on health and public policy as well as her commitment to citizen engagement and participatory democracy sees her engage with print, radio, television, and other online publications.

== Education ==
Baylis' education includes a Certificate of Bilingualism from Laurentian University (1981), political science degree (BA, First Class Honours) from McGill University (1983), followed by an MA (philosophy, 1984) and PhD (philosophy, specialization bioethics, 1989) from the University of Western Ontario. The title of her PhD thesis is "The ethics of ex utero research on spare IVF human embryos" and was completed under the supervision of Benjamin Freedman. In the thesis she introduced (at the time) a "novel ethical distinction between viable and non-viable human embryos." Her concept of "non-viable embryos" as acceptable objects for research is still referenced today.

== Career ==
In 1996 Baylis was appointed at Dalhousie University as an associate professor in the Office of Bioethics Education and Research (later the Department of Bioethics), and in 2004 became Professor and Canada Research Chair in Bioethics and Philosophy. In 2007, she became an elected Fellow of the Royal Society of Canada and the Canadian Academy of Health Sciences. She previously served as an assistant professor of philosophy at the University of Tennessee, Knoxville as well as a Lecturer with the Departments of Paediatrics, Obstetrics & Gynaecology, and Rehabilitation Medicine with the University of Toronto (1991-1993) and Department of Obstetrics & Gynaecology with the University of Western Ontario (1989-1991). Her early employment also included working as an ethics consultant to the Royal Commission on New Reproductive Technologies and as a clinical ethics consultant at hospitals in London, Toronto, Knoxville and Halifax.

Baylis is currently Distinguished Research Professor Emerita, Dalhousie University, having retired from her academic appointment as Professor with the Faculty of Medicine and cross-appointment to the Departments of Obstetrics & Gynaecology and Philosophy (Dalhousie University). She was the founder and leader (since 2003) of Novel Tech Ethics, renamed NTE Impact Ethics (ca.2013), an interdisciplinary research team based at Dalhousie University (with some international collaborators), doing research at the intersection of health, bioethics, and public policy until the time of Baylis' retirement.

Notable achievements during her career include: being named to the "Who's Who in Black Canada" (2002–present) and to "Canadian Who's Who" (2004–present); three Governor-in-Council appointments, including member of the Canadian Biotechnology Advisory Committee (1999-2001), member of Governing Council, Canadian Institutes of Health Research (2001-2004) and member of the Board of Directors, Assisted Human Reproduction Canada (2006-2010); Royal Society of Canada Academic Secretary (Academy I) and Atlantic Steering Committee Chair (2012-2015); and Canada Research Chair (Tier 1) in Bioethics and Philosophy (2004-2018). From 2020 to 2021, she served as the Wayne Morse Chair of Law and Politics, established in honor of the late American Senator, at the University of Oregon. She focused on pushing bioethics past its limits and developing better ways to tackle challenges of public policy.

== Research ==
Baylis has been the principal investigator on eleven Canadian Institutes of Health Research (CIHR) grants (totaling more than $2.4 million), including a New Emerging Team grant, States of Mind: Emerging Issues in Neuroethics. In total, since 1990 she has secured greater than $2.8 million in research funding as a Principal Investigator, > $1.8 million as a Co-Principal- or Co-Investigator, and >$2 million as a Collaborator, Project Advisor or Team Member. As such, her track record in getting support for health ethics research is likely to be unusually successful, especially for someone trained in the humanities.

=== Fields of research ===
Baylis has made numerous contributions to the development of public policy on various assisted human reproduction topics – often the only invited Canadian participant in policy discussions in Europe and elsewhere. Most recently, her reputation garnered an invitation from the US National Academy of Sciences and National Academy of Medicine to join the Planning Committee for an International Summit on Human Gene Editing. Baylis led one of the two Canadian Institutes of Health Research-funded neuroethics teams from 2006 to 2011. Through that six-year program, she helped to head the development of a new field for Canada. She also co-chaired one of the first international neuroethics conferences, "Brain Matters I" in Halifax in 2009. Beyond her research contributions in the realm of assisted reproductive technologies (including contemporary family-making) and women's health in general, Baylis is counted as making contributions to several additional, specific areas of scholarly inquiry:

- Research on bioethics consultants – her early scholarly work with The Health Care Ethics Consultant "represents a critical assessment of both theoretical and practical issues facing practitioners in ethics consultation". This work informed the original standards for ethics consultation prepared by the Society for Health and Human Values – Society for Bioethics Consultation Task Force on Standards for Bioethics Consultation. This was published under the title Core Competencies for Health Care Ethics Consultation, The Report of the American Society for Bioethics and Humanities (1st edition). It is now available in its second edition.
- Research involving children, research involving women, and research involving pregnant women – her research in these three areas looks past the immediate threats of vulnerability, which would presume the non-involvement of these research populations, in order: (i) to: ask why it is important to do research for children, women, and pregnant women; and, (ii) to make sure that this research proceeds on an ethical basis;
- Research surrounding questions of intergenerational justice – her scholarly focus on questions of intergenerational justice has sought to ensure that societal and policy choices about whether and how to pursue new technologies, such as stem cell research, animal-human hybrids and chimeras, or, most recently, embryonic gene editing techniques, give consideration to the potential consequences of those choices, not only consequences in the near term, but also for future generations; and,
- Research about conscientious objection in the practice of medicine – her work in this area (for example, as to whether appeals to conscience can justify refusals to provide medical services on the part of a healthcare practitioners) has relevance both for access to abortion and medical assistance in dying. Her research, with colleagues Carolyn McLeod, Jocelyn Downie, and Daniel Weinstock, has been to find ways to govern medical practice so that it is both fair ("right") and morally effective ("good").

=== Building research capacity and research communities ===
Baylis has also assumed responsibilities for building and maintaining national and international research communities. She was one of the original co-coordinators and advisory board members, as well as the chair of the nominating committee for Feminist Approaches to Bioethics (FAB) – an international network of feminist bioethics researchers. In this regard, Baylis’ work has helped to ensure a venue for publication of feminist bioethics authors with the International Journal of FAB. Moreover, her efforts on behalf of Feminist Approaches to Bioethics (FAB) have fostered community-building among feminist bioethics academics and practitioners as exemplified through FAB's bi-annual World Congress (held in association with International Association of Bioethics meetings). Baylis has also played a role in fostering and helping to direct the health science research community in Canada. She served on the governing councils of the Canadian Biotechnology Advisory Committee (1999-2001), Canadian Institutes of Health Research (2001-2004), and Assisted Human Reproduction Canada (2006-2010). She is known for having advanced the integration of ethics within these agencies and the protection of human research participants. She is also known as an opponent of institutional choices and practices that abet "structural conflict of interest regarding the funding of research and the governance of research ethics."

== Informing public policy and debate ==
As a contributor to feminist ethics, Baylis' orientation stresses the political dimensions of doing bioethics, using one's expertise to impact public policy in the hopes of furthering moral and social progress—in the hopes "to make the world a better place." Baylis has authored and co-authored reports for the United Nations Educational, Scientific and Cultural Organization (for example, regarding the status of scientific researchers). As an example of her efforts at shaping public policy, she has prepared expert testimony for a number of Courts and Canadian Parliamentary Committees for a diversity of bioethics issues, including ethics in the context of clinical trials and governance of assisted human reproduction.

As Baylis' academic career has progressed, the public character of her work, beyond its immediate relevance to public policy, has increased. She is a proclaimed advocate against social injustice, especially regarding the disproportionate burdens placed upon women as a result of assisted reproductive technologies or by virtue of the exclusion of pregnant women from clinical research. For more than a decade she has sought to engage directly with various publics through public education initiatives, media interviews, and social media (@ImpactEthics). Recently, she was appointed to the Order of Canada "for her contributions as a champion of health-care ethics in Canada and for creating forums to discuss current medical-ethics issues." Baylis understands her duties as an academic to help build and cultivate informed, public debate in order to improve the quality of democracy. Speaking as the leader of the NTE Impact Ethics research group she has said: "Our big-picture goal is to support democracy by helping people to understand what the issues are and what is at stake and how they can then think about and position themselves vis-à-vis the science." Her efforts to build ethics literacy at both the local, national, and international level are evidenced through more than a decade of public education and public engagement with NTE Impact Ethics Events.

Since 2011, Baylis has used her second tenure as a Canada Research Chair to focus on "developing new strategies that would allow bioethicists to make just and lasting policy contributions." As coined by Baylis, "impact ethics" is about "question[ing] the status quo in health care", "mak[ing] science subservient to the human good", "mak[ing] public institutions more responsive, accountable, and just", and "critiqu[ing] professional bioethics." Her research projects on "impact ethics" include an emphasis on knowledge translation and mobilization which aim to implement in policy and practice a bioethics that is "responsible", "accountable" and "innovative"—a bioethics that can "make a difference" in serving the public by requiring from those who work in the field to act with "integrity and sensitivity to the real world of healthcare delivery, policy-making and politics." A specific arm of these various projects is the Impact Ethics blog which publishes submissions from a range of authors (students and faculty, academics, and writers outside of academia) with various perspectives on a diversity of subjects for bioethical debate. As Baylis summarizes it: "Impact ethics is about using the tools of ethics to shock, press, crack, and chip society into a better place. It is about outcomes, and ordering the study of ethics around changing things for the better."

== Select research publications ==
- Baylis, F. (2019). Altered Inheritance: CRISPR and the Ethics of Human Genome Editing. Harvard University Press. ISBN 9780674976719.
- Baylis, F.; Dreger, A. (2018). Bioethics in Action. Cambridge University Press. ISBN 9781316343197.
- Baylis, F.; Ballantyne, A., eds. (2016). Clinical Research Involving Pregnant Women. Springer. ISBN 9783319265100.
- Baylis, F (2015). "A relational view of conscience and physician conscientious action". International Journal of Feminist Approaches to Bioethics. 8 (1): 18–36. doi:10.3138/ijfab.8.1.0018. JSTOR 10.3138/ijfab.8.1.0018. S2CID 145692229.
- Baylis, F.; Downie, J. (2014). "Transnational reproductive travel". International Journal of Feminist Approaches to Bioethics. 7 (2).
- Baylis, F.; McLeod, C., eds. (2014). Family-making: Contemporary Ethical Challenges. Issues in Biomedical Ethics. Oxford: Oxford University Press. ISBN 9780199656066.
- Baylis, F.; Hoffmaster, B.; Sherwin, S.; Borgerson, K., eds. (2012). Health Care Ethics in Canada (3rd ed.). Toronto: Nelson. ISBN 9780176504649.
- Nisker, J.; Baylis, F.; Karpin, I.; McLeod, C.; Mykitiuk, R., eds. (2010). The "Healthy" Embryo: Social, Biomedical, Legal and Philosophical Perspectives. Cambridge: Cambridge University Press.
- Baylis, F.; Kenny, S.; Sherwin, S. (2008). "A relational account of public health ethics". Public Health Ethics. 1 (3): 196–209. doi:10.1093/phe/phn025.
- Baylis, F.; Herder, M. (2009). "Policy design for human embryo research in Canada: An analysis. Part 2 of 2". Journal of Bioethical Inquiry. 6 (3): 351–365. CiteSeerX 10.1.1.476.3432. doi:10.1007/s11673-009-9145-6. S2CID 144912643.
- Baylis, F.; Herder, M. (2009). "Policy design for human embryo research in Canada: A history. Part 1 of 2". Journal of Bioethical Inquiry. 6 (1): 109–122. doi:10.1007/s11673-009-9135-8. S2CID 145167552.
- Baylis, F.; McLeod, C. (2007). "The stem cell debate continues: The buying and selling of eggs for research". Journal of Medical Ethics. 33 (12): 726–731. doi:10.1136/jme.2007.022129. PMC 2598212. PMID 18055905.
- Baylis, F.; Robert, J. S. (2004). "The inevitability of genetic enhancement technologies". Bioethics. 18 (1): 1–26. doi:10.1111/j.1467-8519.2004.00376.x. PMID 15168695.
- Baylis, F (2004). "The Olivieri debacle: Where were the heroes of bioethics?". Journal of Medical Ethics. 30 (1): 44–49. doi:10.1136/jme.2003.005330. PMC 1757138. PMID 14872072.
- Baylis, F (2003). "Black as me: Narrative identity". Developing World Bioethics. 3 (2): 142–150. doi:10.1046/j.1471-8731.2003.00070.x. PMID 14768646.
- Robert, J. S.; Baylis, F. (2003). "Crossing species boundaries". American Journal of Bioethics. 3 (3): 1–13. doi:10.1162/15265160360706417. PMID 14594461. S2CID 41847933.
- Baylis, F (2002). "Human cloning: Three mistakes and an alternative". Journal of Medicine and Philosophy. 27 (3): 319–337. CiteSeerX 10.1.1.111.4240. doi:10.1076/jmep.27.3.319.2984. PMID 12187437.
- Baylis, F (2000). "Our cells/ourselves: Creating human embryos for stem cell research". Women's Health Issues. 10 (3): 140–145. doi:10.1016/s1049-3867(00)00042-6. PMID 10828551.
- Baylis, F.; Downie, J.; Kenny, N. (1999). "Children and decision-making in health research". IRB: Ethics & Human Research. 21 (4): 5–10. doi:10.2307/3564418. JSTOR 3564418. PMID 11660758.
- Baylis, F (1997). "Errors in medicine: Nurturing truthfulness" (PDF). Journal of Clinical Ethics. 8 (4): 336–340. doi:10.1086/JCE199708403. PMID 9503082. S2CID 32669711.
- Baylis, F (1996). "Women and health research: Working for change". Journal of Clinical Ethics. 7 (3): 229–242. doi:10.1086/JCE199607306. PMID 8981194. S2CID 30601976.
- Baylis, F., ed. (1994). The Health Care Ethics Consultant. Totowa, NJ: Humana Press. ISBN 978-0-89603-278-1.

== Awards and honours ==
On June 30, 2016, Baylis was appointed to the Order of Canada by Governor General David Johnston for "her contributions as a champion of health-care ethics in Canada and for creating forums for discussing current medical-ethics issues." Other awards and honours include:

- Canada Council for the Arts Molson Prize Winner, 2023.
- Killam Prize winner. Category: Humanities, 2022.
- Queen Elizabeth II, Platinum Jubilee Medal, 2022.
- Association of American Publishers Prose Award Winner. Category: Clinical Medicine, 2020.
- Lifetime Achievement Award, Canadian Bioethics Society/Société canadienne de bioéthique, 2017.
- McNeil Medal, Royal Society of Canada, 2016.
- Order of Nova Scotia, 2016.
- Distinguished Academic Award, Canadian Association of University Teachers (CAUT), 2016.
- Tier I, Canada Research Chair in Bioethics and Philosophy, 2004–2018.
- Black in Canada, special Black History Month tribute, highlighting 28 of Canada's top influencers & trailblazers (24 February 2011).
- Fellow, Royal Society of Canada, The Academies of Arts, Humanities and Sciences, 2007–present.
- Fellow, Canadian Academy of Health Sciences, 2007–2023.
- The Ascension of Effort, Official Black History Month Poster featuring four successful Black Canadians (artist, Robert Small), 2006.
- Canadian Who's Who, University of Toronto Press; Third Sector Publishing, 2004–present.
- Who's Who in Black Canada, 2002–present.
