= List of bioethics centers and institutes =

Bioethics research, education, and service provision have, since the 1970s, been focused in research centers or Research institutes. While the founding centers of bioethics scholarship are North American, notably The Hastings Center and the Kennedy Institute of Ethics in the US, over subsequent decades many others such centers have emerged globally. Note that some of these centers have also been involved in hosting scholarly and professional journals (List of bioethics journals) and participating in bioethics education (List of masters programs in bioethics, List of doctoral programs in bioethics).

== Africa ==
=== Cameroon ===
- Institut Africain de Bioéthique

=== Nigeria ===
- Center for Bioethics and Research

== Asia ==
=== China / Hong Kong ===
- Centre for Applied Ethics

=== Pakistan ===
- Centre of Biomedical Ethics and Culture

== Australasia ==
=== Australia ===
- Adelaide Centre for Bioethics and Culture
- Centre for Human Bioethics
- Monash Bioethics Centre, Monash University

=== New Zealand ===
- Bioethics Centre, University of Otago
- Eubios Ethics Institute

== Europe ==
=== Belgium ===
- Centre for Biomedical Ethics and Law, KU Leuven
- Centre de Bioéthique, Université de Namur

=== Bulgaria ===
- Bulgarian Center for Bioethics

=== France ===
- Centre d’Éthique Médicale--ETHICS 7446, Université Catholique de Lille

=== Germany ===
- Abteilung für Medizinische Ethik und Geschichte der Medizin, Ruhr-Universität
- Akademie für Ethik in der Medizin
- Institut Mensch, Ethik und Wissenschaft
- Institut für Deutsches, Europäisches und Internationales Medizinrecht, Gesundheitsrecht und Bioethik, Universitäten Heidelberg und Mannheim
- Institut für Ethik, Geschichte und Theorie der Medizin, Ludwig-Maximilians-Universität München
- Institut für Ethik, Geschichte und Philosophie der Medizin, Medizinische Hochschule Hannover
- Institut für Ethik und Geschichte der Medizin, Universitätsmedizin Göttingen
- Institut für Geschichte der Medizin und Ethik in der Medizin, Charité Berlin
- Zentrum für Ethik in der Medizin am Agaplesion Markus Krankenhaus

=== Netherlands ===
- Ethics Institute, Utrecht University
- Health Ethics and Society, Maastricht University

=== Norway ===
- Centre for Medical Ethics, University of Oslo
- Bergen Centre for Ethics and Priority Setting, University of Bergen

=== Poland ===
- Center for Bioethics and Biolaw, Uniwersytet Warszawski
- Interdisciplinary Centre for Ethics, Jagiellonian University

=== Portugal ===
- Institute of Bioethics, Catholic University of Portugal

=== Serbia ===
- Center for the Study of Bioethics

=== Slovak Republic ===
- Institute of Medical Ethics and Bioethics, Slovakia Medical University

=== Spain ===
- Institut Borja de Bioètica, Ramon Llull University
- Instituto de Ética Clínica Francisco Vallés, Universidad Europea
- Observatorio de Bioética y Derecho, Universitat de Barcelona

=== Sweden ===
- Centre for Research Ethics & Bioethics (CRB), Uppsala University

=== Switzerland ===
- Interdisciplinary Institute for Ethics in Health Care
- Institute for Biomedical Ethics, University of Basel
- Institute of Biomedical Ethics and History of Medicine, University of Zurich

=== United Kingdom ===
- Anscombe Bioethics Centre
- Centre for Ethics in Medicine, University of Bristol
- Centre for Bioethics & Emerging Technologies, St Mary's University
- Centre of Professional Ethics, University of Central Lancashire
- Ethox Centre, University of Oxford
- Future of Humanity Institute
- Institute of Medical Ethics
- Oxford Uehiro Center for Practical Ethics
- Wellcome Centre for Ethics and Humanities, University of Oxford

== Middle East ==
=== Lebanon ===
- Salim El-Hoss Bioethics and Professionalism Program, American University of Beirut

== North America ==
=== Canada ===
- Biomedical Ethics Unit, McGill University
- Canadian Catholic Bioethics Institute, University of St Michael's College, University of Toronto
- Centre for Bioethics, Memorial University
- Centre of Genomics and Policy, McGill University
- Centre for Health Care Ethics, Lakehead University
- Centre for Health Law Ethics and Policy, University of Ottawa
- Centre for Professional and Applied Ethics, University of Manitoba
- Centre on Values and Ethics, Carleton University
- Institute for Science, Society and Policy, University of Ottawa
- John Dossetor Health Ethics Centre, University of Alberta
- Joint Centre for Bioethics, University of Toronto
- Centre for Clinical Ethics, Providence Healthcare
- Department of Bioethics, Dalhousie University
- National Core for Neuroethics
- Pragmatic Health Ethics Research Unit, IRCM
- W. Maurice Young Centre for Applied Ethics, University of British Columbia
- York Collegium for Public Ethics, York University

=== United States ===
- Albert Gnaegi Center for Health Care Ethics, Saint Louis University
- Alden March Bioethics Institute, Albany Medical College
- Bioethics Center, Children's Mercy
- Bioethics Center for Community Health And Genomic Equity, Case Western Reserve University
- Bioethics Center, Hofstra University
- Center for Bioethics, Cedarville University
- Center for Bioethics, Cleveland Clinic
- Center for Bioethics, Concordia University Wisconsin
- Center for Bioethics, Harvard Medical School
- Center for Bioethics, Indiana University
- Center for Bioethics, New York University
- Center for Bioethics, University of Minnesota
- Center for Bioethics, University of North Carolina
- Center for Bioethics and Humanities, University of Colorado
- Center for Bioethics and Humanities, SUNY Upstate Medical University
- Center for Bioethics and Medical Humanities, University of Mississippi Medical Center
- Center for Bioethics and Medical Humanities, Medical College of Wisconsin
- Center for Bioethics and Social Science in Medicine, University of Michigan
- Center for Bioethics and Social Justice, Michigan State University
- Center for Biomedical Ethics and Society, Vanderbilt University Medical Center
- Center for Children, Law, and Ethics
- Center for Ethics, Emory University
- Center for Ethics in Health Care, Oregon Health & Science University
- Center for Genetics and Society
- Center for Global Ethics & Politics, Ralph Bunche Institute
- Center for Global Health Ethics, Duquesne University
- Center for Health Ethics and Law, West Virginia University
- Center for Health Humanities & Ethics, University Virginia
- Center for Medical Ethics and Health Policy, Baylor College of Medicine
- Center for Practical Bioethics
- Center for the Study of Ethics in Society, Western Michigan University
- Cumberland School of Law's Center for Biotechnology, Law, and Ethics
- Center for Urban Bioethics, Temple University
- Department of Bioethics & Humanities, University of Washington
- Department of Medical History & Bioethics, University of Wisconsin
- Edmund D. Pellegrino Center for Clinical Bioethics, Georgetown University Medical Center
- Ethics Institute, Dartmouth College
- The Hastings Center
- Institute for Bioethics & Health Humanities, University of Texas Medical Branch
- Institute for Ethics and Emerging Technologies
- Johns Hopkins Berman Institute of Bioethics
- Kennedy Institute of Ethics
- MacLean Center for Clinical Medical Ethics
- Maguire Center for Ethics
- Montefiore Einstein Center for Bioethics
- National Catholic Bioethics Center
- Neiswanger Institute for Bioethics, Loyola University
- Providence Center for Health Care Ethics
- Romanell Center for Clinical Ethics and the Philosophy of Medicine, University at Buffalo
- Stanford Center for Biomedical Ethics
- Tuskegee University#National Center for Bioethics in Research and Health Care
- Yale Interdisciplinary Center for Bioethics
