= Jeffrey Bishop =

American philosopher (born 1967)

- Born: 1967 (age 58–59)
- Education: University of Texas Health Science Center at Houston; University of Dallas
- Occupations: Bioethicist, author, academic

Jeffrey Paul Bishop (born 1967) is an American philosopher, bioethicist, author, and the Tenet Endowed Chair of Health Care Ethics at Saint Louis University. The director of the Albert Gnaegi Center for Health Care Ethics, he is most widely recognized and cited for work in medical ethics as relating to death and dying in addition to contributions in the field of medical humanities. Bishop is a physician, holds a Doctorate of Philosophy from the University of Dallas and serves on the editorial boards of both the Journal of Medicine and Philosophy and the Journal of Christian Bioethics for Oxford University Press.

== Biography ==
Bishop grew up in Texas and graduated as a Medical Doctor from the McGovern Medical School of the University of Texas Health Science Center at Houston and a Doctor of Philosophy from the University of Dallas, before joining the faculty of the University of Texas Southwestern Medical Center in 1996. He was the principal lecturer on Medical Ethics and Law at the Peninsula College of Medicine and Dentistry of the University of Exeter and University of Plymouth in the United Kingdom and later directed the Clinical Ethics Education and Consultation Services at Vanderbilt University Medical Center. Bishop also held the position of Associate Professor of Theological Ethics and an active hospitalist at Vanderbilt University before assuming the directorship of the Albert Gnaegi Center for Health Care Ethics in July 2010.

Bishop contributes regularly to numerous journals as well as the Australian Broadcasting Corporation "Religion and Ethics" page. He has edited several special edition journals for Christian Bioethics and the Journal of Medicine and Philosophy for which he sits on the editorial board and is the assistant editor of the Philosophy and Medicine series, Springer Publishing and on the editorial advisory board of Medicine Studies. Bishop is a member of the American Society for Bioethics and Humanities and the American Academy of Religion.

Bishop's scholarly work explores the historical, social, political, and philosophical conditions that underpin contemporary medical and scientific practices and theories.

Bishop's first book is The Anticipatory Corpse:Medicine, Power, and the Care of the Dying which explores the historical, political, and philosophical underpinnings of our care of the dying and, finally, the possibilities of change. It is published by Notre Dame Press.

== Publications ==
=== Books ===
- "The Anticipatory Corpse: Medicine, Power, and the Care of the Dying", Notre Dame Press

=== Selected articles ===
- "Of Life Worlds and Health Savings Accounts: Toward a Familial Philosophy of Health Care Financing", Medicine and Philosophy (A Chinese Journal of Medicine and Philosophy) (2012)
- "Science, Virtue, and the Birth of Modernity, or On the Techno-Theo-Logic of Modern Neuroscience", The Science of Modern Virtue (2012)
- "The Roman Catholic Church, Biopolitics, and the Vegetative State" with Daniel R.Morrison, Oxford University Press (2011)
- "Life, Death (Panels), and the Body Politic" with Joshua E. Perry, Syracuse Law Review (2010)
- "Transhumanism, Metaphysics, and the Posthuman God", Journal of Medicine and Philosophy (2010)
- "Echo Calling Narcissus: What Exceeds the Gaze of Clinical Ethics Consultation?" with Joseph B. Fanning and Mark J. Bliton HEC Forum (2010)
- "Reviving the conversation around CPR/DNR:Â Have the policies outlived their utility", American Journal of Bioethics (2010)
- "Biopsychosociospiritual Medicine and Other Political Schemes" The Journal of Christian Bioethics Oxford University Press.
- "Foucauldian Diagnostics: Space, Time, and the Metaphysics of Medicine", Journal of Medicine and Philosophy Oxford Journals (2009)
- "Rejecting Medical Humanism: Medical Humanities and the Metaphysics of Medicine", Journal of Medical Humanities (2008)
- "Biopolitics, Terri Schiavo, and the Sovereign Subject of Death", Journal of Medicine and Philosophy Oxford Journals (2008)
- "Ethics, Justification and the Prevention of Spina Bifida" with Wendy Jane Gagen, Journal of Medical Ethics (2007)
- "Bioethics as biopolitics" with Fabrice Jotterand, Journal of Medicine and Philosophy Oxford Journals (2006)
- "Framing euthanasia", Journal of Medical Ethics (2006)
- "Euthanasia, efficiency, and the historical distinction between killing a patient and allowing a patient to die", Journal of Medical Ethics, (2006)
- "Retroactive prayer: Lots of History, Not much mystery and No Science" with Victor Stenger, British Medical Journal (2004)
- "Modern Liberalism, Female Circumcision and the Rationality of Traditions", Journal of Medicine and Philosophy Oxford Journals (2004)
- "Prayer, Science and the Moral Life of Medicine", Archives of Internal Medicine (2003)
