= European Center for Studies and Research in Ethics =

The European Center for Studies and Research in Ethics is a tertiary establishment for research and studies in Ethics. This center is located at the premises of the old faculty of medicine at Strasbourg, France. The CEERE (Centre européen d’enseignement et de recherche en éthique) as it is called in French, collaborates with university and higher education institutions both in France and from other countries in its pursuit of research and academics in the domain of Ethics.

== Postgraduate studies in Ethics (Master’s degrees and Doctoral degrees) ==
The CEERE affords students the opportunity to undertake studies for the award of master’s and doctoral degrees in Ethics from the University of Strasbourg. The Masters program can be undertaken in any of five specialities such as Medical Ethics and Bioethics, Ethics and Religions, Ethics and Management, Human Rights: Principles, Norms and Interpretation, as well as in Ethics and Society. This Masters program also had a bilingual program in English and French. The CEERE team is composed of professors and scholars from a wide range of disciplines underlining the pluridisciplinary nature of research that goes on in CEERE.

== The CEERE Alumni ==
There exists an alumni association for former students of CEERE. This association was formed in 2013.

== The international symposia in Ethics ==
The CEERE has organized five international symposia in Ethics in Strasbourg, France, since its inception in 2008.

- The first of its kind was held from Thursday March 30, 2006, through Saturday April 1, 2006. This premier edition was focused on the theme “Dying rites” (Les Rites autour de mourir).
- The second edition was held from Thursday the 29 of March through Saturday March 31, 2007. This second edition centered on the subject of “Giving and Receiving Organs, Right, Due, and Responsibility, (in French: Donner, recevoir un organe. Droit, Dû, Devoir.)
- The third international symposium in Ethics took place from Wednesday March 25 through Saturday March 28, 2009, on the theme: When Nascent life Ends (in French: Quand la vie naissante se termine).
- The fourth international symposium in Ethics held from Wednesday March 23, through Saturday, March 26, 2011. The theme of this fourth edition was “The autumn of Life: The Ethical Challenges of Aging” (in French: L'Automne de la vie: Éthiques du vieillissement.
- The fifth international symposium in Ethics took place from Wednesday April 10, through Saturday April 13, 2013. The theme of this fifth edition was “The Ethical challenges of disability (in French: Les enjeux éthiques du handicap).
