= List of masters programs in bioethics =

This is a list of Master's degree programs with formal specializations / concentrations in Bioethics, by country. Degree programs may include, for example, Master of Arts, Master of Science, Master of Health Science and Master of Bioethics (MBE). These may be dedicated programs, or specializations within other disciplinary programs, such as philosophy, law or health sciences, and refer to bioethics, health ethics, healthcare ethics, etc.

Topics in Bioethics may be the subject of study within many disciplines in the Humanities, Law, the Social sciences and Health sciences, and not exclusively within dedicated bioethics programs. They may also be associated with Bioethics Centers and Institutes. Here are listed only those programs with formal bioethics designations or concentrations.

== Africa ==
=== Nigeria ===
- University of Ibadan - Master of Science and Master of Philosophy (MPhil) in Bioethics

== Oceania ==
=== Australia ===
- Monash University - Master of Bioethics
- University of Sydney - Master of Bioethics
- University of Notre Dame Australia - Master of Bioethics

=== New Zealand ===
- University of Otago - Master of Bioethics and Health Law

== Asia ==
=== Hong Kong ===
- University of Hong Kong - Master of Laws in Medical Ethics and Law

=== Indonesia ===
- Gadjah Mada University - Master of Science in Bioethics

=== Pakistan ===
- Aga Khan University - Master of Bioethics

=== Philippines ===
- University of the Philippines Manila - Master of Science in Bioethics

== Europe ==
=== Austria ===
- https://www.jku.at - Professional Master of Ethics (Medical Ethic)

=== Belgium ===
- KU Leuven - Master in Bioethics
- Université catholique de Louvain - Master in Ethics, Biomedical ethics and Bioethics specialization
- Université libre de Bruxelles - Master in Ethics, Bioethics concentration

=== France ===
- Aix-Marseille University - Master in Ethics: Ethics, Science, Health, Society
- École des hautes études en santé publique & Université de Rennes 1 - Master Law, Health and Ethics
- University of Paris (2019) - Master in Ethics: Research Ethics and Bioethics
- University of Lorraine - Master in Ethics: Ethics of Health, Public Health and New Technologies
- University of Nantes - Master in Ethics: Autonomous Decisions and Practices; Autonomy, Responsibility and Healthcare
- University of Paris-Saclay - Master in Ethics: Ethics, Science, Health and Society
- University of Paris-Est Marne-la-Vallée - Master in Ethics: Applied Medical and Hospital Ethics
- University of Strasbourg - Master in Ethics and Society
- University of Toulouse-Jean-Jaurès - Master in Heath Ethics and Research (philosophy, medicine, law)

=== Germany ===
- University Medical Center of the Johannes Gutenberg-University Mainz - Master of Arts in Medical Ethics

=== Ireland ===
- University College Cork - Master of Science in End-of-Life Healthcare Ethics
- Royal College of Surgeons in Ireland - Master of Science in Healthcare Ethics and Law

=== Netherlands ===
- University of Utrecht - Master in Applied Ethics
- VU University Amsterdam - Master's specialization in Philosophy, Bioethics and Health

=== Spain ===
- King Juan Carlos University - Master in Bioethics
- Universidad Católica San Antonio de Murcia - Master in Bioethics
- Universidad Pontificia Comillas - Master in Bioethics
- University of Barcelona - Master in Bioethics and Law
- University of La Laguna - Master in Bioethics and Health Law
- Institut Borja of Bioethics- Ramon Llull University - Master in Bioethics

=== United Kingdom ===
- Keele University
  - Master of Arts in Medical Ethics and Law
  - Master of Arts in Medical Ethics and Palliative Care
- King's College London
  - Master of Science in Bioethics & Society
  - Master of Science in Global Health & Social Justice
  - Master of Arts in Medical Ethics and Law
- Nottingham Trent University - LL.M. in Health Law and Ethics
- St Mary's University, Twickenham - Bioethics and Medical Law
- University College London
  - Master of Arts in Philosophy, Politics and Economics of Health
  - Master of Arts in Health Humanities
- University of Edinburgh - LL.M. in Medical Law & Ethics
- University of Leeds - Master of Arts in Biomedical and Healthcare Ethics
- University of Manchester
  - LL.M. in Healthcare Ethics and Law
  - Master of Arts in Healthcare Ethics and Law
- University of Oxford - Master of Studies (MSt) in Practical Ethics

== North America ==
=== Canada ===
- McGill University - Specialization in Bioethics: Master of Arts (Philosophy, Religious Studies), LL.M. (Law), M.Sc (Medicine)
- Memorial University of Newfoundland - Master of Health Ethics (MHE)
- Université de Montréal
  - Master of Arts in Bioethics
  - Master of Biomedical Science, clinical ethics option
- University of Ottawa - LL.M. with Concentration in Health Law, Policy and Ethics
- University of Toronto
  - Master of Health Sciences in Bioethics
  - LL.M., M.A., M.HSc., M.Sc., M.N., M.PH. bioethics specialization

=== Mexico ===
- Colegio de Bioética de Nuevo León - Master of Bioethics
- Universidad Anáhuac México - Master of Bioethics

=== United States ===
- Albany Medical College - Master of Science in Bioethics
- Albert Einstein College of Medicine - Master of Science in Bioethics
- Case Western Reserve University - Master of Arts in Bioethics and Medical Humanities
- Clarkson University & Icahn School of Medicine at Mount Sinai - Master of Science in Bioethics
- Creighton University - Master of Science in Health Care Ethics
- Columbia University - Master of Science in Bioethics
- Drew University - Master of Medical Humanities
- Duke University - Master of Arts in Applied Ethics & Policy
- Duquesne University - Master of Arts in Healthcare Ethics
- Emory University - Master of Arts in Bioethics
- Fordham University - Master of Arts in Ethics and Society
- George Washington University - Master of Arts in Philosophy and Social Policy, concentration in Bioethics and Health Policy
- Harvard Medical School - Master of Bioethics
- Hofstra University - Master of Arts in Bioethics, JD/MA Bioethics, MD/MA Bioethics, Certificate in Clinical Bioethics
- Indiana University – Purdue University Indianapolis - Master of Arts in Philosophy, Bioethics concentration
- Johns Hopkins University - Master of Bioethics
- Kansas City University of Medicine and Biosciences - Dual diploma, Doctor of Osteopathic Medicine and Master of Arts in Bioethics
- Lake Erie College of Osteopathic Medicine - Master of Science in Biomedical Ethics
- Loma Linda University - Master of Arts in Bioethics
- Loyola Marymount University - Master of Arts in Bioethics
- Loyola University Chicago - Master of Arts in Bioethics & Health Policy
- Medical College of Wisconsin - Master of Arts in Bioethics
- New York University - Master of Arts in Bioethics
- Northwestern University - Master of Arts in Medical Humanities & Bioethics
- Ohio State University - Master of Arts in Bioethics
- St. Thomas University - Master of Science in Bioethics
- Stony Brook University - Master of Arts in Bioethics
- Temple University - Master of Arts in Urban Bioethics
- Trinity International University - Master of Arts in Bioethics
- Tulane University - Master of Science in Bioethics and Medical Humanities
- University of Louisville - Master of Arts in Interdisciplinary Studies, concentration in Bioethics and Medical Humanities
- University of Mary - Master of Science in Bioethics
- University of Minnesota - Master of Arts in Bioethics
- University of Pennsylvania
  - Master of Bioethics
  - Master of Science in Medical Ethics
- University of Pittsburgh - Interdisciplinary Master of Arts in Bioethics
- University of Rochester - Master of Science in Medical Humanities
- University of Texas Medical Branch - Master of Arts in Medical Humanities
- University of Washington - Master of Arts in Bioethics
- Vanderbilt University - Master of Arts in Medicine, Health and Society
- Wake Forest University - Master of Arts in Bioethics

== South America ==
=== Argentina ===
- FLACSO Latin American School of Social Sciences (Argentina) - Master in Bioethics
- Universidad del Museo Social Argentino - Master in Bioethics
- National University of Córdoba - Master in Bioethics

=== Brazil ===
- Universidade de Brasília - Master in Bioethics
- Pontifícia Universidade Católica do Paraná - Master in Bioethics

=== Colombia ===
- El Bosque University - Master in Bioethics
- Pontifical Xavierian University - Master in Bioethics

=== Chile ===
- Pontifical Catholic University of Chile - Master in Bioethics
- University of Chile - Master in Bioethics
- Universidad del Desarrollo - Master in Bioethics

=== Ecuador ===
- Pontificia Universidad Católica del Ecuador - Maestría en Bioética

== Sources ==
- The Hastings Center - Graduate Programs
- American Society for Bioethics and Humanities - Bioethics and Humanities Academic Programs
- Bioethics.com - Academic Degree and Certificate Programs
- List of Canadian bioethics programs
