= List of doctoral programs in bioethics =

This is a list of doctoral programs (Ph.D. or professional doctorate) with formal specializations / concentrations in bioethics, by country. These may be dedicated degrees in bioethics, or specializations within other disciplinary programs, such as philosophy, law or health sciences. They may refer to bioethics, health ethics, healthcare ethics, etc., and they may also be associated or offered in conjunction with bioethics centers and institutes.

== Africa ==
=== Nigeria ===
- University of Ibadan - Ph.D. in Bioethics

== Australia and New Zealand ==
=== Australia ===
- Monash University - Ph.D in philosophy, Bioethics specialization
- University of Sydney - Ph.D., Bioethics specialization

=== New Zealand ===
- University of Otago - Ph.D. in Bioethics

== Europe ==
=== Belgium ===
- University of Leuven - Centre for Biomedical Ethics and Law - Ph.D. in Biomedical Sciences, Bioethics specialization

=== Czech Republic ===
- Masaryk University - Ph.D. in Bioethics

=== Greece ===
- University of Crete - Ph.D. in Bioethics

=== Portugal ===
- University of Porto - Ph.D. in Bioethics

=== Spain ===
- University of Barcelona - Ph.D. in Bioethics and Law
- Valencia Catholic University Saint Vincent Martyr - Ph.D. in Bioethics

=== Switzerland ===
- University of Basel - Ph.D. in bioethics, Health Policy and Legal Medicine
- University of Geneva - Ph.D. in Biomedical Science, Bioethics specialization
- University of Zurich - Ph.D. in Biomedical Ethics and Law
- ETH Zurich (Swiss Federal Institute of Technology in Zurich) - Ph.D. in Bioethics

=== United Kingdom ===
- University of Birmingham
  - Ph.D. in Biomedical Ethics
  - Ph.D. in philosophy, Global Ethics specialization
- University of Bristol - Ph.D. in Ethics and Medicine
- University of Manchester - Ph.D. in Bioethics and Medical Jurisprudence

== Intergovernmental ==
- EUCLID (University) - Ph.D. in bioethics (Clinical and Global Health Bioethics)

== North America ==
=== Canada ===
- Université de Montréal
  - Ph.D. in Bioethics
  - Ph.D. in Biomedical Science, clinical ethics option
- University of Toronto
  - Ph.D. (Philosophy, Nursing, Health Sciences, etc.) bioethics specialization

=== Mexico ===
- Universidad Anáhuac México - Doctorate of Bioethics

=== United States ===
- Albany Medical College - Doctorate of Professional Studies in Bioethics
- Arizona State University - Ph.D. in Biology and Society, Concentration in Bioethics, Policy and Law
- Duquesne University - Ph.D. and DHCE in Healthcare Ethics
- Icahn School of Medicine at Mount Sinai & Clarkson University - Ph.D. in Philosophy/Master in Bioethics
- Johns Hopkins University - Ph.D. in Health Policy & Management, concentration in Bioethics & Health Policy
- Loyola University Chicago - Doctor of Bioethics
- Case Western Reserve University - Ph.D. in Bioethics
- Michigan State University - Ph.D. in philosophy, Concentration in Philosophy and Ethics of Health Care
- Pennsylvania State University - Ph.D. in Anthropology and Bioethics; PhD in Biobehavioral Health and Bioethics; PhD in Communication Arts and Sciences and Bioethics; PhD in Kinesiology and Bioethics; and PhD in Nursing and Bioethics
- Saint Louis University - Ph.D. in Health Care Ethics
- University at Albany - Ph.D. in Philosophy/MS Bioethics
- University of Texas Medical Branch - Ph.D. in Bioethics and Health Humanities

== South America ==
=== Colombia ===
- El Bosque University - Ph.D. in Bioethics
- Nueva Granada Military University - PhD in Bioethics

== Sources ==
- The Hastings Center - Graduate Programs
- American Society for Bioethics and Humanities - Bioethics and Humanities Academic Programs
- Bioethics.com - Academic Degree and Certificate Programs
- List of Canadian bioethics programs
