= Alper Derinboğaz =

Turkish architect (born 1982)

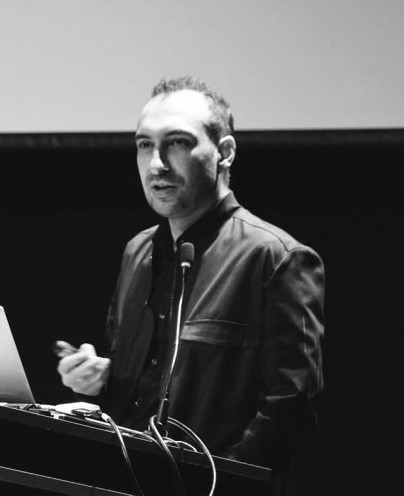
- Alper Derinboğaz
- Born: 1982 (age 43–44)
- Education: University of California Los Angeles USA, Istanbul Technical University
- Occupation: Architect
- Practice: http://www.salonarchitects.com//
- Buildings: Museum of Istanbul, Fitaş Passage, Villa Topos

Alper Derinboğaz (Turkish pronunciation: [alpæɾ deɾiɲboːaz]; born in 1982) is a Turkish architect and the founder of Salon Alper Derinboğaz. The business was recognized as one of ArchDaily’s Best Young Practices of 2020. Derinboğaz represented Turkey in its debut year at the Venice Architecture Biennale in 2014 with the installation of Modalities of the Spontaneous, an investigation into the urban transformation of Istanbul.

== Career ==
Derinboğaz graduated from Istanbul Technical University in 2005 and received a Fulbright scholarship to study at UCLA, where he won the Graduate Award for his master's studies. He founded Salon Alper Derinboğaz while working in Los Angeles.

In 2019, Derinboğaz was selected as one of the 40 Under 40 architects of Europe by The European Center. Later, his office was named the "Best Young Practice" in 2020 by ArchDaily. He is frequently invited to events as a speaker; his works have been featured in global art and architectural publications. He also teaches architectural and urban design studios as an adjunct professor.

== Work ==
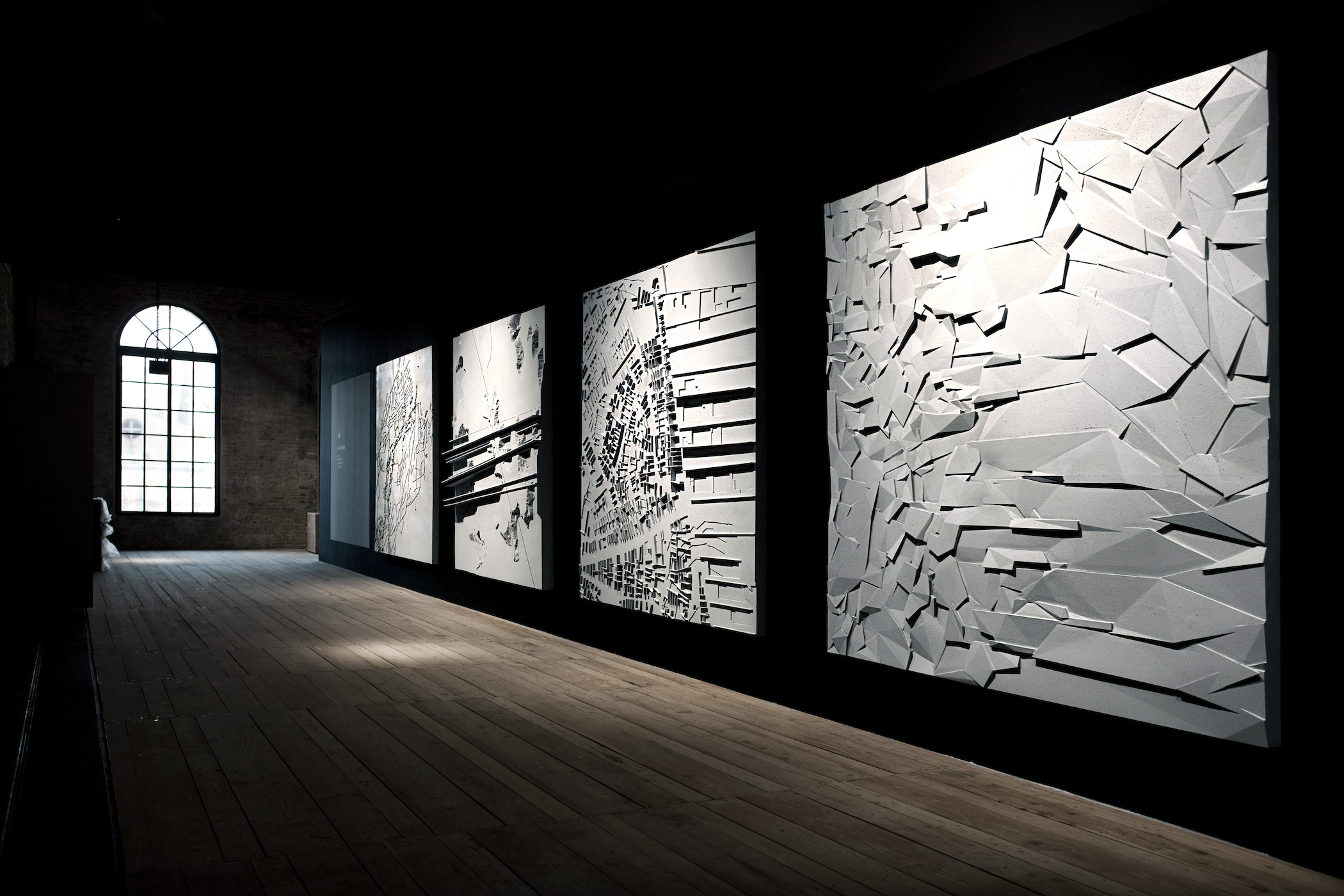
Modalities of the Spontaneous at the 14th Venice Architecture Biennale

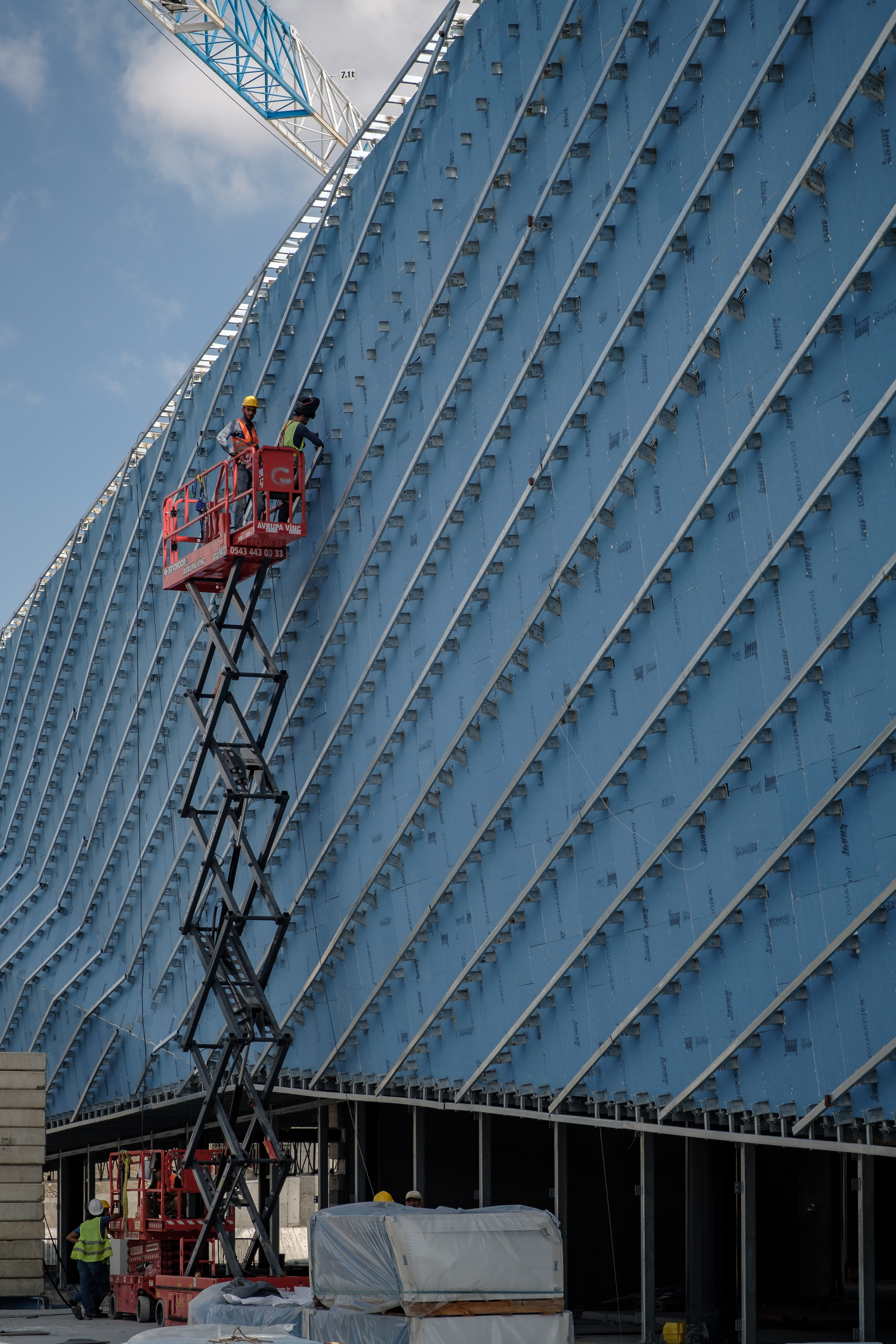
Site photo, building the panelized facade of the Museum of Istanbul

In 2014, his work "Modalities of the Spontaneous" was exhibited at the 14th Venice Architecture Biennale as part of the Turkish Pavilion, Places of Memory. The work consisted of a series of reliefs generated through an investigation into the transformation of urban texture in the Levent district in Istanbul.

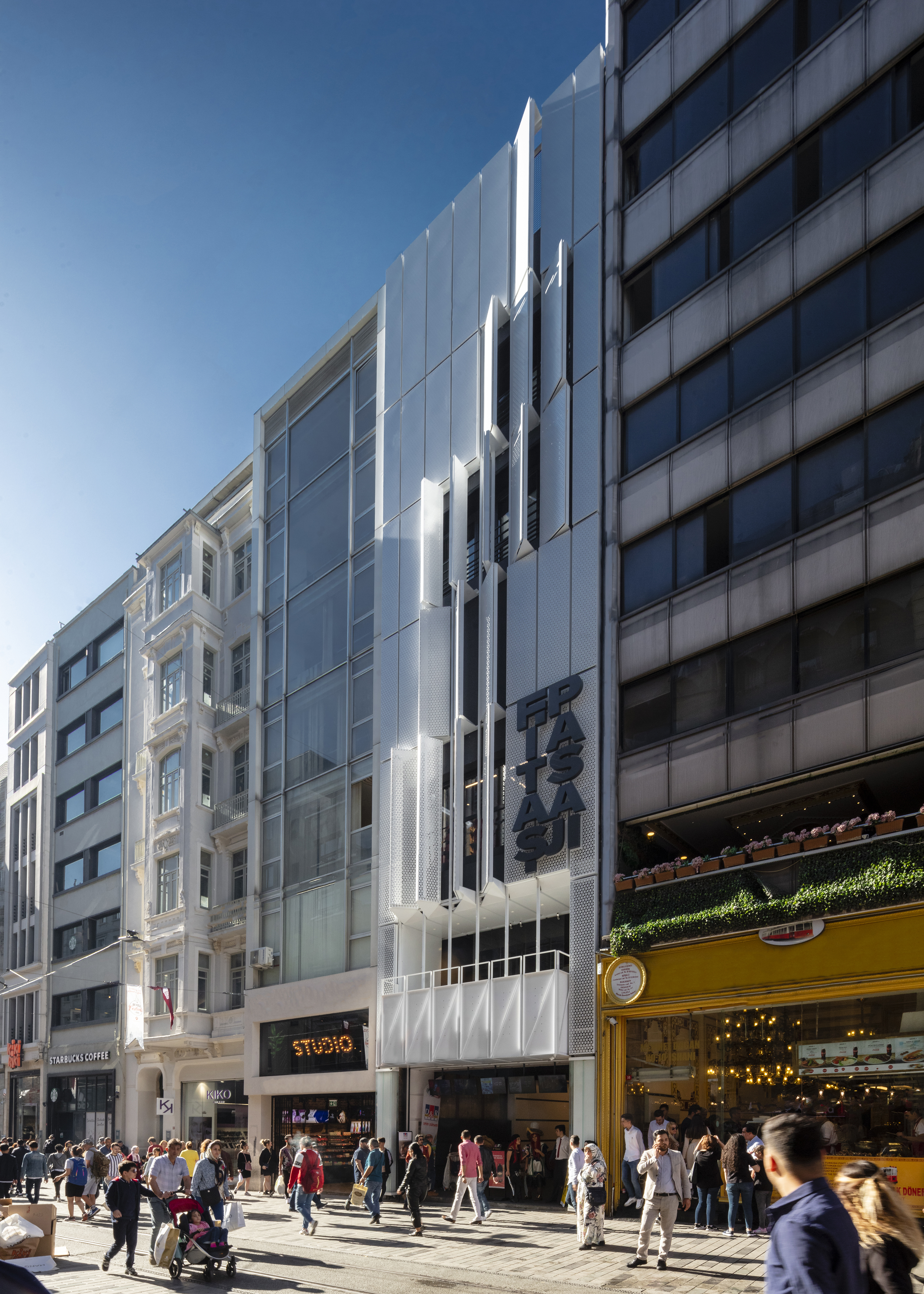
Fitaş Passage is an adaptive reuse project located on Istiklal Avenue in Istanbul.

His adaptive reuse project Fitaş Passage was completed in 2019, located in İstiklal Avenue.

=== Projects ===
- Modalities of the Spontaneous, Pavilion of Turkey at la Biennale di Venezia, Venice 2014
- Museum of Istanbul, Istanbul
- Fitaş Passage, Istanbul, 2019
- Augmented Structures v1.1, Yapı Kredi Culture and Arts Centre, Istanbul 2011
- Villa Topos, Çeşme, İzmir, (completed 2021)
- Learning Sky Library, Songdo, South Korea 2021
- Green HUB Masterplan, Antalya
- Stoa House, Istanbul, (completed 2017)
- Science Island, Kaunas, Lithuania, 2016

=== Books ===
- 2021, Geoscapes (ed. Emmy Bacharach), (asst. ed. Emre Taş)
- 2018, Upwind (ed. Turkay, B.), (designer; Gürevin, A.)
- 2014, Places of Memory (ed. Derviş, P.), Conversation (Luca Molinari in conversation with A.Altay, A.Derinboğaz, P.Derviş, M.Özcan, C.Şişman, M.Tabanlıoğlu, A.Taptık, S.Taycan), pp. 6–80, Istanbul Foundation for Culture and Arts, Istanbul
- 2011, My City (eds. Açıkkol, Ö. & Yersel, S.), Alper Derinboğaz, Panorama için Mimari Tasarım (interview) pp. 124–131, British Council, Istanbul
- 2010, City Index Elefsina (ed. Antonopoulou, E.), Float’d Project, pp. 116–121, School of Architecture Technical University of Athens, Athens

== Recognitions ==
- 2020 ArchDaily Best Young Practices Award
- 2019 Europe 40 Under 40 Selection, Architecture, The European Center

== Awards ==
- 2021 Songdo Library International Design Competition, Honorable Mention
- 2020 Istanbul's Cemetery Design Competition (Cihat Burak) 1st Prize
- 2020 VELUX Bringing Light to Life Award, Chinimachin Museum
- 2017 German Design Awards, Winner, German Design Council (Parkopera)
- 2017 World Architecture Awards, Winner (Parkopera)
- 2016 International Contest for the New National Science and Innovation Center Honorable Mention
- 2016 World Architecture Awards Winner (Office Central)
- 2016 WAF Finalist (Parkopera)
- 2015 International Architizer A+ Award Special Mention
