= Aysha Akhtar =

American neurologist

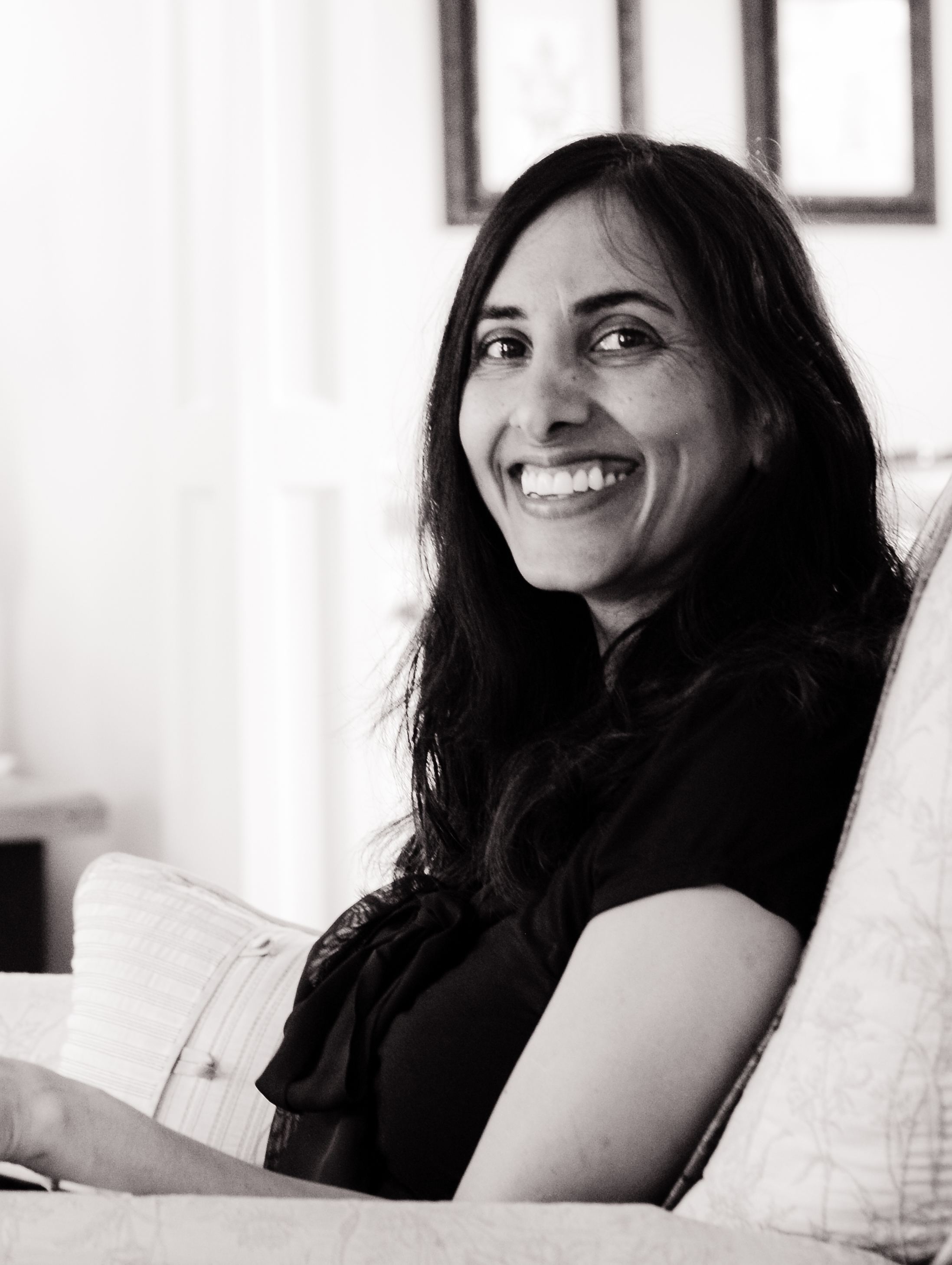
- Education: Master's degree in Public Health
- Occupations: Co-founder and CEO of the Center for Contemporary Sciences
- Known for: Neurologist, public health specialist, animal ethicist

Aysha Akhtar is an American neurologist, public health specialist and animal ethicist. Akhtar is co-founder, CEO, and President of the Center for Contemporary Sciences. She is a US veteran.

== Biography ==
Akhtar has a master's degree in public health and is double board-certified in both neurology and preventive medicine. She was a Medical Officer for the Food and Drug Administration's Office of Counterterrorism and Emerging Threats and Commander in the U.S. Public Health Service. She was previously Deputy Director of the Army's Traumatic Brain Injury Program.

Akhtar is a Fellow of the Oxford Centre for Animal Ethics and is a consultant editor for the Journal of Animal Ethics. She is a long-term advocate of animal rights and attended animal protection events from a young age.

In 2019, Akhtar authored Our Symphony with Animals: On Health, Empathy, and Our Shared Destinies which combines medicine, social sciences and personal stories. Her book explores how empathy with animals deeply affects humans' health and well-being. Akhtar argues that animals are co-equals, worthy of compassion and respect. She has stated that "I am on a mission to show how treating animals with kindness is not only good for animals, but also good for us."

She was a speaker at The Rethinking Animals Summit and the DC VegFest in 2019.

== Personal life ==
Aysha Akhtar is married and lives in Maryland. She is a first generation Pakistani American and is a contemporary artist. Akhtar is a vegan.

== Selected publications ==
- Animals and Public Health: Why Treating Animals Better is Critical to Human Welfare (Palgrave Macmillan, 2012)
- The Need to Include Animal Protection in Public Health Policies (Journal of Public Health Policy, 2013)
- The Flaws and Human Harms of Animal Experimentation (Cambridge Quarterly of Healthcare Ethics, 2015)
- Our Symphony with Animals: On Health, Empathy, and Our Shared Destinies (Pegasus Books, 2019) ISBN 978-1-64313-070-5
