= Christian Bioethics =

Peer-reviewed journal

Christian Bioethics: Non-Ecumenical Studies in Medical Ethics
- Language: English

Publication details
- Publisher: Oxford Academic
- Impact factor: 0.3 (2025)
- ISO 4: Find out here

Indexing
- 1380-3603
- ISSN: 1380-3603 (print); 1744-4195 (web)

Links
- Journal homepage

Christian Bioethics: Non-Ecumenical Studies in Medical Ethics is a peer-reviewed journal focused on bioethics from a Christian point of view. A non-ecumenical, interdenominational publication, it explores to the meaning of human life, sexuality, suffering, illness, and death within the context of medicine and health care. It is characterized by its distinct, substantive doctrinal commitment, other than finding a watered-down consensus among different Christian groups.

Among its current and former editors, H. Tristram Engelhardt Jr. and Mark Cherry are worth mentioning.

== Abstracting and indexing ==
The journal is abstracted and indexed in:

- ATLA religion database
- Guide to Social Science & Religion in Periodical Literature
- The Philosopher's Index
- Scopus
- Social Science Research Network (SSRN)
