= Thomas Tomlinson =

Thomas Tomlinson may refer to:

- Thomas A. Tomlinson (1802–1872), U.S. Representative from New York
- Thomas Tomlinson (philosopher) (born 1945), philosophy professor and medical ethicist at Michigan State University
