= Ruth Macklin =

American philosopher and bioethicist

Dr. Ruth Macklin
- Born: Ruth Chimacoff; March 27, 1938 (age 88); Newark, New Jersey
- Awards: Lifetime Achievement Award, Yenepoya University, Mangaluru, India, Lifetime Achievement Award, Public Responsibility in Research & Medicine (PRIM&R), Hastings Center’s Henry Knowles Beecher Award, Global Forum on Bioethics in Research, Award for contributions to progress in international research ethics, Lifetime Achievement Award in Recognition of Outstanding Contributions and Significant Publications in Bioethics and Humanities, American Society for Bioethics and Humanities, Resident fellowship at the Rockefeller Foundation’s Study and Conference Center, Bellagio, Italy

Education
- Education: Cornell University Case Western Reserve University

Philosophical work
- Institutions: Albert Einstein College of Medicine, New York City
- Main interests: Bioethics

Ruth Macklin is an American philosopher and retired professor of bioethics.

== Education ==
Ruth Macklin studied philosophy at Cornell University then received Ph.D. in philosophy from Case Western Reserve University.

== Career ==
She is distinguished university professor emerita at Albert Einstein College of Medicine in New York City. She has more than 280 scholarly publications and books on HIV/AIDS, the ethics of human reproduction, the ethics of human subjects in research, health policy, public health ethics, and more. She has been adviser to the World Health Organization, chairperson of a committee at UNAIDS and at the Centers for Disease Control and Prevention, a member of several ethical review committees, an elected member of the National Academy of Medicine, co-chair of the National Advisory Board on Ethics in Reproduction, is a member of the American Society for Bioethics and Humanities, served as president of the International Association of Bioethics, is a member of the Scientific Advisory Board of PEPFAR, and was a vice president and member of executive committee, Council for International Organizations of Medical Sciences (CIOMS), Geneva. Macklin is a fellow of the Hastings Center, an independent bioethics research institution.

== Selected bibliography ==
=== Books ===
- Macklin, Ruth; Gaylin, Willard; Powledge, Tabitha M. (1981). Violence and the politics of research. New York, New York: Plenum Press. ISBN 9780306407895.
- Macklin, Ruth; Gaylin, Willard (1981). Mental retardation and sterilization: a problem of competency and paternalism. New York: Plenum Press. ISBN 9780306406898.
- Macklin, Ruth (1982). Man, mind, and morality: the ethics of behavior control. Englewood Cliffs, New Jersey: Prentice-Hall. ISBN 9780135511275.
- Macklin, Ruth; Gaylin, Willard (1982). Who speaks for the child: the problems of proxy consent. New York, New York: Plenum Press. ISBN 9780306408601.
- Macklin, Ruth (1987). Mortal choices: bioethics in today's world. New York, New York: Pantheon Books. ISBN 9780394559025.
- Macklin, Ruth (1988). Mortal choices: ethical dilemmas in modern medicine. Boston, Massachusetts: Houghton Mifflin. ISBN 9780395468470.
- Macklin, Ruth (1993). Enemies of patients. New York, New York: Oxford University Press. ISBN 9780195072006.
- Macklin, Ruth (1994). Surrogates & other mothers: the debates over assisted reproduction. Philadelphia: Temple University Press. ISBN 9781566391801.
- Macklin, Ruth (1999). Against relativism: cultural diversity and the search for ethical universals in medicine. New York, New York: Oxford University Press. ISBN 9780195116328.
- Macklin, Ruth (2004). Double standards in medical research in developing countries. Cambridge, UK New York, New York: Cambridge University Press. ISBN 9780521541701.
- Macklin, Ruth; et al. (2011). Intimidad, confidencialidad y protección de datos de salud: Aportaciones del IV Seminario Internacional sobre la "Declaración Universal sobre Bioética y Derechos Humanos" de la UNESCO. Cizur Menor: Civitas Thomson Reuters. ISBN 9788447037667.
- Macklin, Ruth (2012). Ethics in global health: research, policy, and practice. New York, New York: Oxford University Press. ISBN 9780199890453.

=== Journal articles ===
- Macklin, Ruth (1989). "Liberty, utility, and justice: an ethical approach to unwanted pregnancy". International Journal of Gynecology & Obstetrics. 30 (s1): 37–49. doi:10.1016/0020-7292(89)90102-1. S2CID 33381263.
- Macklin, Ruth (Autumn 1990). "Maternal-fetal conflict: an ethical analysis". Women's Health Issues. 1 (1): 28–30. doi:10.1016/S1049-3867(05)80011-8. PMID 2136298.
- Macklin, Ruth (May 2000). "Ethics, politics, and human embryo stem cell research". Women's Health Issues. 10 (3): 111–115. doi:10.1016/S1049-3867(00)00040-2. PMID 10828545.
- Macklin, Ruth (20 December 2003). "Dignity is a useless concept". British Medical Journal. 327 (7429): 1419–1420. doi:10.1136/bmj.327.7429.1419. PMC 300789. PMID 14684633.
- Macklin, Ruth (June 2012). "Ethics in HIV prevention research: clarifying the complexities". The American Journal of Bioethics. 12 (6): 31–32. doi:10.1080/15265161.2012.671889. PMID 22650458. S2CID 26483003.
- Macklin, Ruth; Cowan, Ethan (July 2012). "Given financial constraints, it would be unethical to divert antiretroviral drugs from treatment to prevention". Health Affairs. 31 (7): 1537–1544. doi:10.1377/hlthaff.2012.0071. PMC 3572856. PMID 22778343.
- Macklin, Ruth; Cowan, Ethan (October 2012). "Unconsented HIV testing in cases of occupational exposure: ethics, law, and policy". Academic Emergency Medicine. 19 (10): 1181–1187. doi:10.1111/j.1553-2712.2012.01453.x. PMC 3473147. PMID 22994417.
- Macklin, Ruth (October 2012). "Revising the declaration of Helsinki: a work in progress". Indian Journal of Medical Ethics. 9 (4): 224–226. doi:10.20529/IJME.2012.078. PMID 23099591.
- Macklin, Ruth (Fall 2012). "A global ethics approach to vulnerability". International Journal of Feminist Approaches to Bioethics. 5 (2): 64–81. doi:10.2979/intjfemappbio.5.2.64.
- Macklin, Ruth (November 2012). "Aesthetic enhancement? or human rights violation?". Hastings Center Report. 42 (6): 28–29. doi:10.1002/hast.91. PMID 23138368.
- Macklin, Ruth (December 2012). "Good in theory: can it work in practice?". American Journal of Bioethics. 12 (12): 55–56. doi:10.1080/15265161.2012.739387. PMID 23215932. S2CID 205860118.

== See also ==
- American philosophy
- List of American philosophers
