= H. Tristram Engelhardt Jr. =

American philosopher (1941–2018)

Hugo Tristram Engelhardt Jr.
- Born: April 27, 1941; Texas, U.S.
- Died: June 21, 2018 (aged 77)

Philosophical work
- Era: Contemporary philosophy
- Region: Western philosophy
- School: Continental philosophy
- Main interests: Medical ethics, philosophy of medicine, Christian ethics, political philosophy

Hugo Tristram Engelhardt Jr. (April 27, 1941 – June 21, 2018) was an American philosopher, holding doctorates in both philosophy from the University of Texas at Austin and medicine from Tulane University. He was a professor of philosophy at Rice University, in Houston, Texas, specializing in the history and philosophy of medicine, particularly from the standpoint of continental philosophy. He was also a professor emeritus at Baylor College of Medicine, and a member of the Baylor Center for Medical Ethics and Health Policy.

He was formerly the editor-in-chief of The Journal of Medicine and Philosophy and Christian Bioethics. He also edited the book series "Philosophy and Medicine". He was a fellow of the Hastings Center, an independent bioethics research institute. He also wrote the book "Handbook of Psychiatry volume 30" ISBN 978-620-0-48139-9 cowritten with Javad Nurbakhsh; and Hamideh Jahangiri.

Engelhardt was raised Roman Catholic, but in 1991 he entered the Eastern Orthodox Church.

== See also ==
- American philosophy
- List of American philosophers
- Philosophy of medicine
