= American Society for Bioethics and Humanities =

- Abbreviation: ASBH
- Predecessor: Society for Health and Human Values, Society for Bioethics Consultation, American Association of Bioethics
- Formation: January 1998
- Type: Learned society
- Purpose: Promoting bioethics research
- Location: Chicago, Illinois
- President: Kayhan Parsi
- President-elect: Toby Schonfeld
- Executive Director: Mary Beth Benner
- Website: asbh.org

The American Society for Bioethics and Humanities is an American learned society dedicated to promoting research and the exchange of ideas in bioethics and related disciplines in the humanities. It was founded in January 1998 from the merger between the Society for Health and Human Values (SHHV), the Society for Bioethics Consultation (SBC), and the American Association of Bioethics (AAB), which were founded in 1969, 1986, and 1994, respectively.

== Presidents ==
- Toby Schonfeld, PhD (President-Elect, to serve 2023-25)
- Kayhan Parsi, JD, PhD, HEC-C (2021-23)
- Ana Smith Iltis, PhD (2019-21)
- Alex Kon, MD, HEC-C, FAAP, FCCM (2017–19)
- Amy Haddad, PhD, RN (2015–17)
- Felicia Cohn, PhD, MA, HEC-C (2013–15)
- Joseph Fins, MD, FACP (2011–13)
- Mark Kuczewski, PhD, HEC-C (2009–11)
- Hilde Lindemann, PhD (2008–09)
- Tod S. Chambers, PhD (2007–08)
- Paul Root Wolpe, PhD (2006–07)
- Matthew K. Wynia, MD, MPH, FACP (2005–06)
- Arthur R. Derse, MD, JD (2004–05)
- Jonathan D. Moreno, PhD (2003–04)
- John D. Lantos, MD, HEC-C (2002–03)
- Kathryn Montgomery, PhD (2001–02)
- Laurie Zoloth, PhD (2000–01)
- Thomas H. Murray, PhD (1999-2000)
- Mary Faith Marshall, PhD, HEC-C (1998–99)
- Loretta M. Kopelman, PhD (1998)

== Lifetime Achievement Award ==
- 2022 - Patricia A. King, JD
- 2021 - Stuart J. Youngner, MD
- 2020 - Ezekiel Emanuel, MD PhD
- 2019 - Christine Grady, PhD RN
- 2018 - Dan W. Brock, PhD
- 2017 - Myra Christopher and Steven H. Miles, MD
- 2016 - Arthur Caplan, PhD
- 2015 - Baruch Brody, PhD
- 2014 - Nancy Dubler, LLB
- 2013 - H. Tristram Engelhardt Jr., MD PhD
- 2012 - Kathryn Montgomery, PhD
- 2011 - Ruth Faden, PhD MPH
- 2010 - Mark Siegler, MD
- 2009 - Howard Brody, MD PhD
- 2008 - Robert M. Veatch, PhD
- 2007 - Renée C. Fox, PhD
- 2006 - Ronald E. Cranford, MD and Bernard Gert, PhD
- 2005 - Eric Cassell, MD MACP
- 2004 - Tom L. Beauchamp, PhD, James F. Childress, PhD, and Joanne Trautmann Banks, PhD
- 2003 - Jay Katz, MD
- 2002 - Ruth Macklin, PhD
- 2001 - Daniel Callahan, PhD
- 2000 - John C. Fletcher, PhD
- 1999 - Albert R. Jonsen, PhD
- 1998 - Edmund D. Pellegrino, MD
