= Carolyn McLeod =

Canadian bioethicist and feminist philosopher

Carolyn McLeod FRSC
- Born: 1969 (age 56–57)
- Spouse: Andrew Botterell

Academic background
- Education: BA, MA, Queen's University at Kingston; PhD, Dalhousie University
- Thesis: Self-trust and reproductive autonomy. (1999)
- Doctoral advisor: Susan Sherwin
- Website: carolynmcleod.com

Carolyn McLeod (born 1969) is a Canadian philosopher specializing in Feminist Ethics and Bioethics. She is a Distinguished Professor and the Associate Dean, Research and Graduate Studies for the Faculty of Arts & Humanities at the University of Western Ontario. In 2021, she was elected a Fellow of the Royal Society of Canada.

== Early life and education ==
McLeod was born in 1969. She completed her Bachelor of Arts degree and Master's degree at Queen's University at Kingston before enrolling at Dalhousie University for her PhD. While completing her doctorate, McLeod worked under feminist philosopher Susan Sherwin. Her thesis was titled Self-trust and reproductive autonomy.

== Career ==
Following her PhD, McLeod joined the Department of Philosophy at the University of Western Ontario (UWO). In this role, she received the 2009 University Students’ Council Award of Excellence in Undergraduate Teaching. McLeod was later named the 2011 Graham and Gale Wright Distinguished Scholar. She was shortly thereafter promoted to Chair of the Department of Philosophy and began applying for a Canada Research Chair.

In 2020, McLeod published Conscience in reproductive health care: prioritizing patient interests through the Oxford University Press. The following year, McLeod was elected a Fellow of the Royal Society of Canada for her "research on ethical issues in reproductive health care, and her work on the ethics of parenthood and adoption, and key concepts in moral philosophy such as trust and autonomy."

In 2024 McLeod was named a Distinguished University Professor at the University of Western Ontario.

== Personal life ==
McLeod is married to fellow philosopher Andrew Botterell.

== Selected publications ==
- Conscience in reproductive health care: prioritizing patient interests (2020)
