= Thomas Tomlinson (philosopher) =

Thomas Tomlinson (born 1945) is a philosophy professor and medical ethicist currently teaching at Michigan State University, where he holds a joint appointment in the Lyman Briggs College and the philosophy department.

Tomlinson earned his M.A. and Ph.D in philosophy at Michigan State. He teaches courses on medical ethics, nursing ethics, and veterinary ethics.

== Contributions to philosophy ==
Tomlinson has published widely in medical ethics literature. He is especially interested in resuscitation decisions, organ donation and determinations of death, and ethical aspects of international research.

== Professional publications ==
Tomlinson authored the book Nursing Ethics. In addition, he authored several articles in journals such as The Journal of Medical Ethics, The Journal of Clinical Ethics, The Kennedy Institute of Ethics Journal, The Journal of Medicine and Philosophy, The Hastings Center Report, Academic Medicine, and The Gerontologist 31.

== Selected works ==
- Tomlinson, T. (2008). "Caring for risky patients: Duty or virtue?". Journal of Medical Ethics. 34 (6): 458–462. doi:10.1136/jme.2007.022038. PMID 18511620. S2CID 5650419.
- Tomlinson, Thomas P. "Ethical Issues" (Chapter 12). In Palliative Practices: An Interdisciplinary Approach. Ed. Kuebler KK, Davis MP, Moore CD. St. Louis, Elsevier-Mosby: 2005
- Tomlinson, Tom; Michalski, Antony J.; Pentz, Rebecca D.; Kuuppelomäki, Merja (2001). "Futile care in oncology: When to stop trying". The Lancet Oncology. 2 (12): 759–764. doi:10.1016/S1470-2045(01)00592-7. PMID 11902519.
- Tomlinson, Thomas P. "Telethics and the Virtual Intensivist." Journal of Clinical Ethics 12 (Spring) 2001:69-72.
- "On Being Genetically 'Irresponsible'" Judith Andre, Leonard Fleck, Tom Tomlinson. Kennedy Institute of Ethics Journal, June 2000.
- Tomlinson, Tom (1999). "Ethics Consultant: Problem Solver or Spiritual Counselor?". Performance, Talk, Reflection. pp. 43–52. doi:10.1007/978-94-017-2556-9_5. ISBN 978-90-481-5222-3. S2CID 144702981.
- Andre, Judith; Fleck, Leonard; Tomlinson, Tom (1999). "Improving Our Aim". The Journal of Medicine and Philosophy. 24 (2): 130–147. doi:10.1076/jmep.24.2.130.2536. PMID 10344422. S2CID 40686162.
- Tomlinson, Thomas P. "Perplexed about Narrative Ethics", in Stories and Their Limits: Narrative Approaches to Bioethics, ed. Hilde Nelson. Routledge, 1997.
- Tomlinson, Tom; Czlonka, Diane (1995). "Futility and Hospital Policy". The Hastings Center Report. 25 (3): 28–35. doi:10.2307/3562112. JSTOR 3562112. PMID 7649743.

== See also ==
- Environmental ethics
