= Fritz Jahr =

German theologian (1895–1953)

Paul Max Fritz Jahr (January 18, 1895 in Halle (Saale) —October 1, 1953) was a German theologian, pastor and teacher in Halle. He is considered the founder of bioethics.

== See also ==
- Van Rensselaer Potter
