= Feminist bioethics =

Subfield of bioethics which advocates gender and social equality

Feminist bioethics is a subfield of bioethics which advocates gender and social equality through the critique of existing bioethical discourse, offering unique feminist arguments and viewpoints, and pointing out gender concerns in bioethical issues.

Emerging around the end of the twentieth century, feminist bioethics is a diverse academic field involving the use of social, philosophical, and feminist theories to examine and criticize gender biases and inequalities implied in bioethical problems, theories, and methodologies. Feminist critiques of bioethics include androcentrism, gendered concepts, and overemphasis on individual rights. Feminist bioethics offers unique perspectives on several bioethical issues, such as the concept of health, healthcare, the patient-physician relationship, and reproductive issues. There are several criticisms of feminist bioethics, such as a lack of agreement among feminist bioethical arguments due to the plurality and diversity of feminist bioethical discourse, the conceptualization of feminine vulnerability as reinforcing gender oppression, and the field's loss of uniqueness as feminist perspectives in academia become increasingly common.

== History ==
As bioethics became an established discipline in philosophy in 1970s, feminist critiques of bioethics started in the late 1980s and gained recognition and attention as a separate philosophical focus in the 1990s. At the time, it was largely dismissed by the mainstream bioethics community. The origin of feminist bioethics as an area of study can be traced to several articles published in Hypatia: A Journal of Feminist Philosophy. These early articles focused largely on bioethical issues related to technologies connected to female reproductive concerns, such as abortion, IVF, and surrogacy.

In the 1990s, feminist bioethics marked its official disciplinary existence with the book Feminist Perspectives in Medical Ethics by Helen Holmes and Laura Purdy, which was published in 1992 as a collection of journal articles that had previously been published in Hypatia in the 1980s. Several other books with feminist standpoints about bioethics were also published, including No Longer Patient: Feminist Ethics and Health Care by Susan Sherwin in 1992, Feminism and Bioethics: Beyond Reproduction by Susan Wolf in 1996, and Feminist Approaches to Bioethics: Theoretical Reflections and Practical Applications by Rosemarie Tong in 1997.

Feminist Approaches to Bioethics (FAB), a network of feminist bioethics, was founded in 1992, along with its own publications of academic journals in the International Journal of Feminist Approaches to Bioethics (IJFAB).

== Theories and methodologies ==
As in feminist theory as a whole, there exists no unifying "feminist bioethics", due to heterogeneity in the positions of different feminist critiques of mainstream bioethical positions. Nonetheless, commonalities between different fields of feminist bioethics exist.

- Ethics of care is a feminist ethical theory often applied by feminist bioethicists. It emphasizes including consideration of personal relations and values of care, love, and responsibility, rather than traditional ethical principles, to permit more subtle and holistic ethical discussions.
- The idea that autonomy is relational is also frequently seen in feminist bioethical arguments. It points out that autonomy is not simply one's freedom of action, given that everybody is to some extent interdependent, but rather that anyone's freedom is dependent on and requires support through the cooperation of others.
- Many feminist approaches share the methodological commonality of "raising the woman question" through the analysis and interrogation of gender inequalities. Feminist philosophical theories are often expected to be applied in the discourse to advocate for gender justice. Human rights principles can also be adopted in advocating women's rights. Empirical observations and experiences, social and political theories, and public health research findings are also commonly incorporated into feminist bioethical studies.

Feminist bioethics can disagree with each other about what should be viewed as being in women's best interest, due to the diversity of opinion in the field.

== Feminist critiques on bioethics ==
=== Androcentrism ===
Western philosophy has been historically dominated by men as a male-centered discipline, and women's perspectives and representations in the discipline were often excluded. Traditionally, accounts from exclusively men are regarded as complete accounts and women's only as supplements. Men's experiences and values are sufficient to be viewed as and eventually define norms for all humanity. Men are the "neutral" group and women are the group that departs from men.

Androcentrism has been reflected in medical research. In 1988, a research on the effects of aspirin in decreasing the risk of heart disease was conducted by Physician Health Study, It investigated 22,000 men and zero women. In 1990, the United States Government Accountability Office reported that women were not sufficiently represented in clinical trials. Such underrepresentation of women in medical research poses questions about drug safety for women, especially regarding dosage-sensitive drugs, given that women's average body weight is less than men's. It has been argued that women's exclusion from medical research is due to the elimination of variables like the fluctuation of female hormonal levels and the difficulty of women's participation and ability to remain in research, as they often have difficult managing conflicts between drug trials, childcare, and work. Feminist bioethics argues that hormonal fluctuation should be considered an important factor in medical research rather than be ignored, and that clinical trials should be designed to accommodate women's lives and working schedules.

=== Gendered concepts ===
Concepts that frequently appear in philosophical discussions are often gendered. Reason is often associated with men, while emotion is associated with women. Since the ancient era of human history, women have been viewed as inferior to men physically, emotionally, and intellectually. Gendered associations distort the meanings of these concepts and reflect patriarchal attitudes towards women. Reason is thought to be the best guide for moral judgments, while relying on emotion is thought to be unreliable and even primitive. Emotion being viewed as something lower and less desirable than reason implies a general lack of concern and compassion for patients' individual situations. The result is a pattern of abstraction: patients and medical professionals are viewed not as distinct persons but as interchangeable subjects with generic characteristics operating under universal principles. Under such abstraction, the gender of patients is excluded from considerations and reduced to something more general, more "neutral". Women are subsumed into men.

=== Overemphasis on individual rights ===
The tendency of bioethicists to use theories that appeal to human rights over-simplifies moral arguments by excluding other non-rights moral considerations. Some even equate the over-appeal to rights as resembling the idea of domination in masculinism. Moreover, broad appeals to human rights tend to prioritize the civil and political rights of men and dominant groups, while overlooking those of women and minority groups.

== Feminist perspectives on bioethical issues ==
=== Concept of health ===
One view is that the level of achievable health is tied to power differences caused by gender, race, and class. It is argued that a positive state of well-being is more easily achieved by well-off, able-bodied, heterosexual white men than others. Women, on the other hand, are more likely to suffer from poverty, often as an intersectionality of racism and sexism, and their pain is often taken less seriously than men. Simultaneously, women's physical well-being is burdened with the duty of a youthful and sexy appearance, which can push women into "extreme" behaviours in pursuit of unapproachable beauty standards.

=== Healthcare ===
The healthcare system, especially in the US, is often hierarchical and masculinist, as patients who are white and male have easier access to healthcare than those who are nonwhite and female. Within the healthcare system, nonwhite and female physicians are more often primary care physicians, while white and male physicians are more often surgeons. Even in medical trials, disadvantaged groups like women and people of color are often excluded.

Medical practices are heavily influenced by sexist, classist, and racist norms. Certain common practices in the healthcare system often assume and reinforce gender roles that disproportionately harm women. For example, a woman does not have autonomy over her own fertility, because she needs to obtain consent from her husband to get herself sterilized; on the other hand, vasectomy for a man can be done in a week.

=== Patient-physician relationship ===
Power dynamics in the patient-physician relationship are linked to equality and inequality in communication. Patients' gender and race affects the standard of medical care received from physicians. Female patients who challenge physicians are more likely to be perceived as uncooperative, while male patients who challenge physicians are seen as rational participants in their own treatment. Similarly, female patients tend to receive information with less clarity from physicians. Patients with less power, typically women and individuals of color, frequently receive lower-standard care; this can include longer wait times for service, worse treatment, disregard of personal wishes, and less information or lower accuracy of information given. Medical care is often regarded as a private issue for patients, which makes it more difficult to observe the inequality that results from patients' gender and race.

There is also the concern about whether a patient should be viewed as a "generalized other" or a "concrete other". The "generalized other" view tends to see all patients as equally entitled to the same level of care and without regard for personal differences, while the "concrete other" view tends to see each patient as a unique individual with particular interests and needs. The "generalized other" is more distant and less intimate to physicians. Seeing patients as the "generalized other" has been the norm in health care, but feminist bioethics argues for seeing patients as the "concrete other", with a more empathetic attitude to individual concerns.

=== Reproductive issues ===
Feminist bioethicists' contributions to discussions on reproductive issues are not only limited to opinions from female perspectives, but also to the revelation of the structural power difference in the areas that affect women's reproductive experience and concerns. For example, it is argued that new reproductive technologies should not be considered "gender neutral", since they disproportionately affect women's welfare. Concerns over the "use" of reproductive tissues as exploitations of female bodies in research and therapy is also brought up.

== Criticisms ==
- Disagreements and confusion: Diversity and plurality of the discourse of feminist bioethics often lead to disagreements within the literature, which not only lessen the force and distinctiveness of the feminist standpoint but also confuses the public, and especially women.
- Vulnerability conceptualization: Similar to the problem of victimization, the tendency to stress the vulnerability of women suggests a connection between weakness and femininity. Though it is an effective approach in feminist discussions to bring awareness to these topics, it also risks normalizing the aggression against women and reinforces the opposition of gender and sex.
- Loss of uniqueness: In recent years, as "alternative" feminist perspectives have appeared more often in non-feminist bioethical literature and publications, the uniqueness of feminist bioethics seems to be toned down in the literature. On the one hand, it is a good trend to have feminist awareness expand into bioethical discussions, but on the other hand it also threatens the definition of "feminist bioethics" and questions such categorization of a "feminist view". One response to this is that the adoption and inclusion of feminist viewpoints is only partial, given that the fundamental commitment of advocating for social and political equality is often left out by non-feminist publications.
