= Albert Gnaegi Center for Health Care Ethics =

- Type: Albert Gnaegi Center for Health Care Ethics
- Headquarters: Salus Center, 3545 Lafayette, Medical Campus, SLU
- Location: Saint Louis, Missouri, United States
- Director: Jason Eberl
- Website: bioethics.slu.edu

The Albert Gnaegi Center for Health Care Ethics is an independent health sciences academic unit of Saint Louis University. The center has a high academic output and offers Doctorate of Philosophy programmes in Health Care Ethics and clinical bioethics. The current director is Jason Eberl, PhD. Prior to Dr. Eberl the center was led by Jeffrey Bishop, who joined the Center in July 2010 from Vanderbilt University and was previously at the Peninsula College of Medicine and Dentistry in the United Kingdom and the University of Texas. He is the author of The Anticipitory Corpse: Medicine, Power, and the Care of the Dying and sits on the editorial board of The Journal of Medicine and Philosophy and The Journal of Christian Bioethics, both Oxford Journals.
