= Steven H. Miles =

American physician

Steven H. Miles is an American doctor, author, and professor of medicine who has published on ethical topics relating to medicine and the use of torture.

Miles is a practicing physician and professor of medicine at the University of Minnesota Medical School and is a member of its Center for Bioethics. He is a recipient of the Distinguished Service Award of the American Society of Bioethics and Humanistics. Miles is a fellow of the Hastings Center, an independent bioethics research institution.

Miles is the author of two books on medical ethics, one focusing on the Hippocratic Oath, the other on physicians and torture.

== Selected bibliography ==
- Steven H. Miles, The Hippocratic Oath and the Ethics of Medicine, Oxford University Press, 2004
- Steven H. Miles, Oath Betrayed: America's Torture Doctors, University of California Press, April 20, 2009, ISBN 978-0-520-25968-3.

== See also ==
- Lists of books
- Lists of authors
- Bioethics
