= Baruch Brody =

American bioethicist (1943–2018)

Baruch A. Brody
- Born: April 21, 1943
- Died: May 30, 2018
- Education: Brooklyn College (BA); Princeton University (PhD)
- Occupations: Bioethicist, philosopher
- Known for: Work in bioethics, applied ethics, and Jewish ethics

Baruch A. Brody (21 April 1943 – 30 May 2018) was an American bioethicist. He was the Leon Jaworski Professor of biomedical ethics and former Director of the Center for Ethics, Medicine and Public Issues at The Baylor College of Medicine and Andrew Mellow professor of Humanities in the Department of Philosophy at Rice University.

== Education and career ==
Brody received his B.A. from Brooklyn College in 1962 and his Ph.D. from Princeton University in 1967. He joined the Rice University philosophy department in 1975, and retired in 2018.

In 2002, Brody was considered as a candidate to be the fourth president of Yeshiva University.

He was elected to the National Academy of Medicine in 2001 and was a fellow of the Hastings Center.

== Philosophical work ==
Brody was among the first scholars in the field of applied ethics to write about abortion in the era following Roe v. Wade, including four articles in four different journals, culminating in his 1975 book Abortion and the Sanctity of Human Life: A Philosophical View.

He has been noted for his contributions to Jewish ethics, as one of a number of "professional bioethicists with medical training" who uses "Judaic resources and reasoning to illustrate and augment their arguments."

== Selected publications ==
- Abortion and the Sanctity of Human Life: A Philosophical View. (MIT Press, 1975).
- Identity and Essence (Princeton, 1980).
- Life and Death Decision Making (Oxford University Press, 1987).
- Ethical Issues in Drug Testing Approval and Pricing (Oxford University Press, 1994)
- The Ethics of Biomedical Research (Oxford University Press, 1998)
- Taking Issue (Georgetown, 2005)
