= Cambridge Quarterly of Healthcare Ethics =

- Discipline: Bioethics
- Language: English
- Edited by: Thomasine Kushner

Publication details
- History: 1992-present
- Publisher: Cambridge University Press
- Frequency: Quarterly
- Impact factor: 1.204 (2017)

Standard abbreviations
- ISO 4: Camb. Q. Healthc. Ethics

Indexing
- ISSN: 0963-1801 (print); 1469-2147 (web)

Links
- Journal homepage

The Cambridge Quarterly of Healthcare Ethics is a quarterly peer-reviewed academic journal in the field of bioethics. It was established in 1992 with the goal of exploring "the many implications of both the broader issues in healthcare and society and of organizational concerns arising in the institutions in which ethics committees are located." Its primary focus, as indicated in its title, is healthcare ethics, understood as distinct from clinical ethics, medical ethics, and academic ethics insofar as it is inductive, interdisciplinary, and concerned with "the character and traditions of the institutions in question." One of its primary goals has been to integrate "many disciplines as they apply to the work of healthcare ethics committees. In the pages of this journal will be found sections devoted to medicine, law, philosophy, economics, research, theology, education, behavioral and social sciences, and more — with a focus on practical applications in committee settings."
