= Jocelyn Downie =

Canadian legal scholar

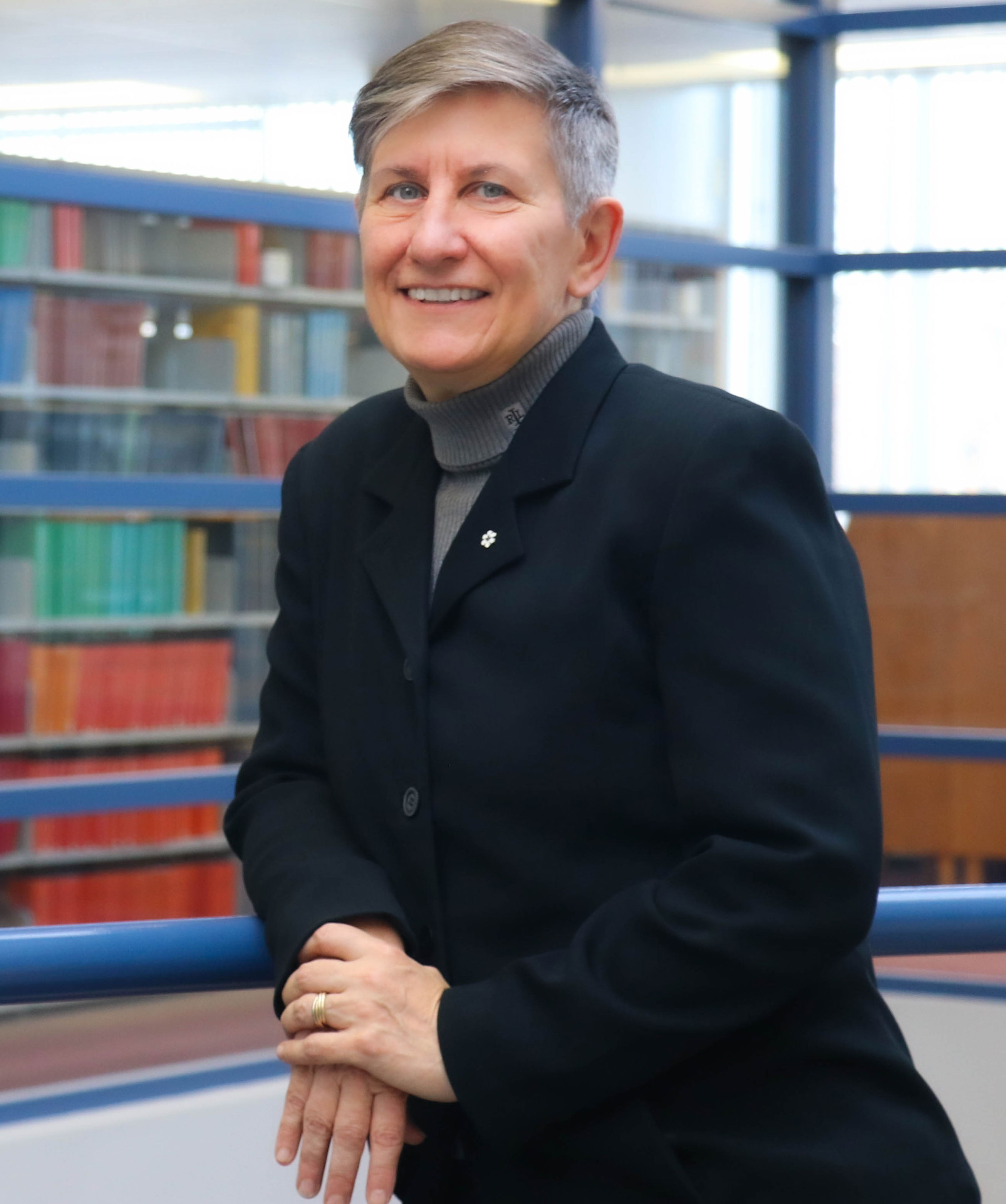
- Born: 1962 (age 63–64); Kingston, Ontario, Canada

Academic background
- Education: B.A., M.A., Queen's University; LLB., University of Toronto; LLM, SJD, University of Michigan
- Thesis: Dying justice: an argument for law reform with respect to voluntary assisted death in Canada. (1999)

Academic work
- Institutions: Schulich School of Law
- Main interests: end-of-life law, policy, and care

Jocelyn Grant Downie OC FRSC was the James S. Palmer Chair in Public Policy and Law at Schulich School of Law. She was the first Dalhousie scholar to be named a Pierre Elliott Trudeau Foundation Fellow.

== Early life and education ==
While studying at Queen's University, Downie volunteered at Kingston General Hospital as a candy striper. While there, she saw an advertisement for palliative care volunteers and trained them to become one. After earning her Bachelor of Arts and Master's degree, Downie earned her M.Litt at the University of Cambridge. Upon her return to Canada, Downie accepted a position as a research associate at the Westminster Institute for Ethics and Human Values.

== Career ==
After law school, Downie clerked for Chief Justice Lamer at the Supreme Court of Canada, and after graduate school she was the director of Dalhousie Health Law Institute. In 2004, she published "Dying Justice: A Case for Decriminalizing Euthanasia and Assisted Suicide in Canada." In her role as director, she was selected to be a Canada Research Chair in Health Law and Policy and sat on the Experts Committee for Human Research Participant Protection in Canada. In 2010, Downie was elected a Fellow of the Royal Society of Canada.

In 2015, Downie was involved in the result of Carter v Canada. She served as a Special Advisor to the Canadian Senate Committee on Euthanasia and Assisted Suicide and worked with the pro bono legal team in the case. In the same year, Downie became the first scholar in Nova Scotia to be named a Pierre Trudeau Trudeau Foundation Fellow. She used this fellowship to gather data regarding assisted dying in Canada. She also sat on the Provincial-Territorial Expert Advisory Group on Physician-Assisted Dying. The next year, she received the 2016 CIHR Barer-Flood Prize in Health Services and Policy Research. On July 1, 2016, Downie was appointed to University Research Professor for a five-year period.

In 2018, Downie was appointed the James S. Palmer Chair in Public Policy and Law at Schulich School of Law. She was also named a member of the Order of Canada.
