= Mark Cherry =

American academic in applied ethics

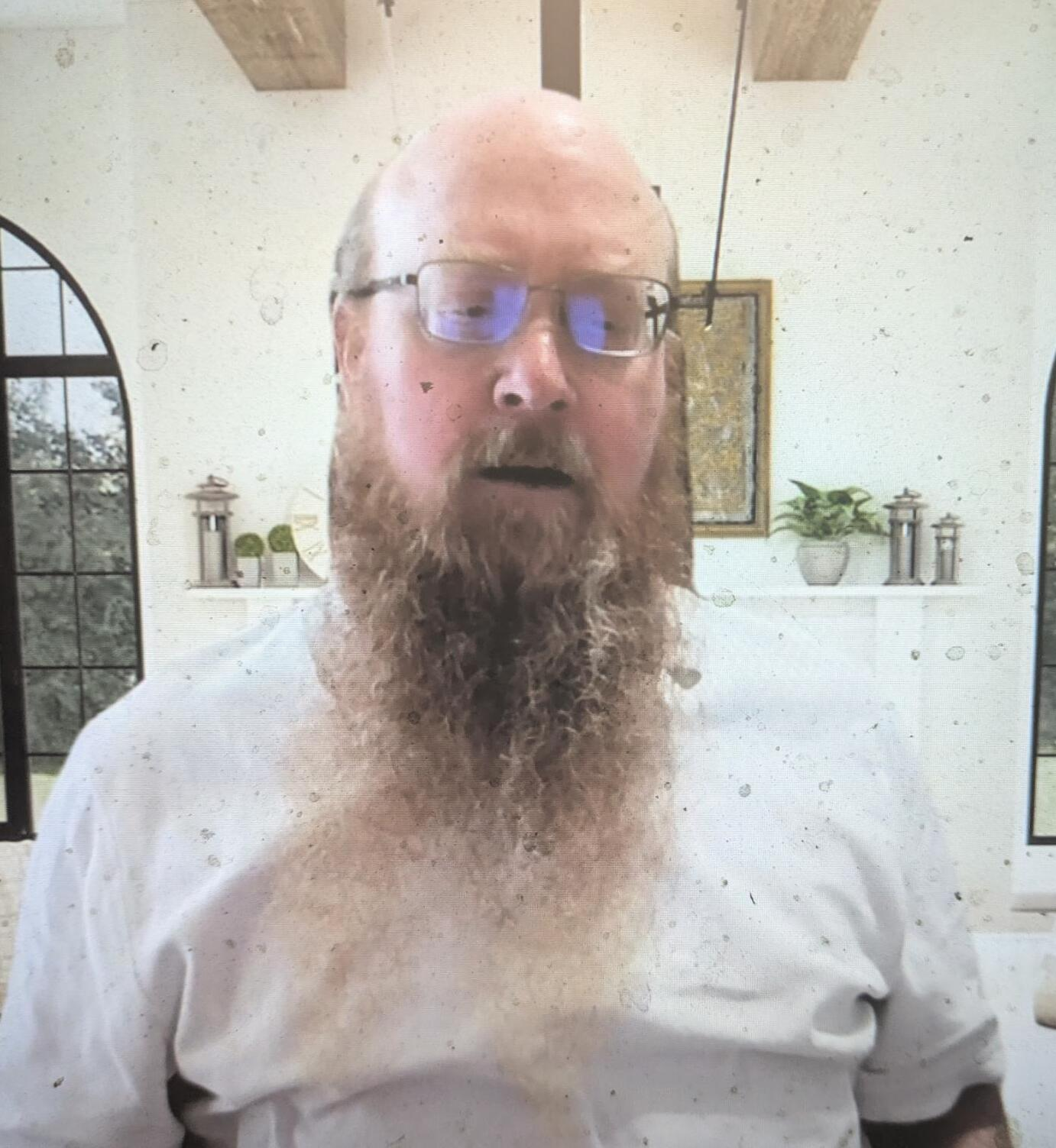
Mark J. Cherry

Mark J. Cherry is the Dr. Patricia A. Hayes Professor in Applied Ethics at St. Edward's University, Austin, Texas. He is the author of Kidney for Sale by Owner: Human Organs, Transplantation, and the Market (2005), in which he argues that human body parts are commodities, and that the market is the most efficient and morally justified way to procure and allocate organs for transplant. His argument is based in part on what he calls the moral authority of persons over themselves. Cherry is the editor of the Journal of Medicine and Philosophy, Christian Bioethics, editor-in-chief of the Health- Care Ethics Committee Forum, and series co-editor of the Annals of Bioethics.

== Books ==
- Kidney for Sale by Owner: Human Organs, Transplantation, and the Market. Georgetown University Press, 2005. ISBN 1-58901-040-X, 9781589010406
- Sex, Family, and the Culture Wars. Transaction Publishers, 2016. ISBN 978-1412863315
