= Yale Interdisciplinary Center for Bioethics =

Bioethics research center

- Location: New Haven, Connecticut, United States
- Affiliations: Yale University
- Website: bioethics.yale.edu

The Yale Interdisciplinary Center for Bioethics, or YICB, is an academic research center based primarily in the study of biomedical ethics.

It is partnered with the Hastings Center to sponsor visiting Yale/Hastings Bioethics scholars. It also hosts the Sherwin Nuland international Summer Bioethics Institute (SBI). It is a subsidiary of the Institution for Social and Policy Studies (ISPS).

Director Stephen Latham was contacted by a Yale neuroscience team led by Nenad Sestan that had restored metabolic and cellular function in pig brains ex vivo. The YICB ultimately agreed that Sestan's team had violated no ethical standards. Latham recommended that guidelines regarding such practices should be established as similar experiments are carried out.
