= Who's Who in Black Canada =

Canadian non-profit website

Who's Who in Black Canada is a non-profit website with the goal of researching and showcasing Black Canadians.

== History ==
In 1999, Dawn Williams felt that there were an absence of Canadian publications showcasing prominent Canadians of African descent. She spent the next three years researching and compiling content to produce a comprehensive snapshot of the contributions of African Canadians, encompassing every province and territory of Canada in both French and English.

In 2002, she self-published the first edition of Who's Who in Black Canada, featuring more than 500 profiles. In 2004, she completed and published the second edition of Who's Who in Black Canada.

In June 2010, Williams was approached by the design and branding firm The Ricardo McRae Agency about taking over her project and publishing the profiles from the book online. She transferred the ownership of the book content and the digital rights to the agency to The Ricardo McRae Agency.

On August 1, 2010, the organization's official website was launched. On January 15, 2015, the website was converted to a platform highlighting black excellence and was rebranded as Black In Canada.

== Publications ==
- Williams, Dawn (January 2002). Who's Who in Black Canada: Black Success and Black Excellence in Canada: A Contemporary Directory. ISBN 978-0-9731384-1-2.
- Williams, Dawn (December 2006). Who's Who in Black Canada (2 ed.). ISBN 978-0-9731384-2-9.

== See also ==
- List of black Canadians
