= List of Canadian bioethics programs =

This following list of Canadian bioethics undergraduate and graduate programs was developed by the Canadian Task-force of the Association of Bioethics Program Directors in March 2017, based on a 2012 list developed by the Canadian Bioethics Society.

Institution	Unit/Department	City	Province	Degree	Program
McGill University	Biomedical Ethics Unit, Philosophy, Religious Studies, Law, Medicine	Montreal	Quebec	Master (of Arts, Science, Law)	MA, MSc, LL.M with Specialization in Bioethics
Memorial University of Newfoundland	Bioethics Group, Faculty of Medicine	St. John's	Newfoundland & Labrador	Master	Master of Health Ethics
Université de Montréal	School of Public Health	Montreal	Quebec	certificate, graduate diploma, MA, PhD	Bioethics
Université de Montréal	Faculty of Medicine	Montreal	Quebec	certificate, MSc, PhD	Clinical ethics options in MSc and PhD in Applied Biomedical Sciences
Université du Québec à Chicoutimi	Religious studies, Ethics, Philosophy	Chicoutimi	Quebec	certificate	Bioethics certificate
Université de Québec à Rimouski	Philosophy	Rimouski	Quebec	graduate diploma, MA	Concentration in applied ethics and health
Université Laval	Faculty of Philosophy	Quebec	Quebec	certificate, graduate diploma	Concentration in applied ethics and health
University of Toronto	Philosophy & Joint Centre for Bioethics	Toronto	Ontario	BA Honours	Major and Minor in Bioethics
University of Toronto	Department of Public Health Sciences & Joint Centre for Bioethics	Toronto	Ontario	MHSc	Master of Health Science in Bioethics
University of Toronto	School of Graduate Studies and Joint Centre for Bioethics	Toronto	Ontario	LLM, MA, MHSc, MSc, PhD	Collaborative Program in Bioethics
