= Susan Sherwin =

Canadian philosopher (born 1947)

Susan Sherwin CM FRSC FCAHS
- Born: 6 June 1947 (age 79)

Education
- Education: York University; Stanford University

Philosophical work
- Era: Contemporary philosophy
- Region: Western philosophy
- Institutions: Dalhousie University
- Main interests: Bioethics; applied ethics; feminist ethics

Susan Sherwin CM FRSC FCAHS (born 6 June 1947) is a Canadian philosopher. Her pioneering work has shaped feminist theory, ethics and bioethics, and she is considered one of the world's foremost feminist ethicists.

== Education ==
Sherwin received a B.A. (Hons.) in mathematics and philosophy from York University (1969) and a Ph.D. in philosophy from Stanford University (1974). Her dissertation, “Moral Foundations of Feminism”, was written under the supervision of Thomas Schwartz, and was the first dissertation in the United States on feminist ethics. Sherwin also completed a post-doctoral fellowship in the Moral Problems of Medicine Project at Case Western Reserve University (1973–1974).

== Career ==
Sherwin arrived at Dalhousie University in 1974 as the Department of Philosophy's first female faculty member, later becoming the department's first female chair; she was also an architect of Dalhousie's Gender and Women's Studies program, twice serving as its coordinator. She also was a founding member of the Dalhousie Women Faculty Organization. She served on the Board of Directors of Halifax Transition House, was part of the first equity committee of the Canadian Philosophical Association, and was a founding member of the Canadian Society for Women in Philosophy. Throughout her career at Dalhousie, Sherwin advocated for reform of the university's hiring practices in order to diversify the higher ranks with more women and minorities in positions of power.

Sherwin joined the executive of the Dalhousie Faculty Association in 1974, and in this capacity helped start a certification drive for form a trade union for faculty (with the exception of clinical medicine). She was appointed to the negotiating team that drafted and bargained for the union's first collective agreement. She was elected the first female President of the DFA, and the agreement was concluded during her term.

== Work ==
Sherwin's graduate training began in the logic and philosophy of mathematics, but quickly evolved into health care ethics and feminist philosophy. In the mid-1980s, she combined these two areas of research to consider the implications of a distinctively feminist approach to bioethics. Sherwin's groundbreaking 1992 book, No Longer Patient: Feminist Ethics and Health Care, was the first book-length treatment of feminist bioethical theory, and “the first book that combined feminist philosophy with health care ethics to examine contemporary health issues through a feminist lens”. Considered a “landmark event in bioethics”, No Longer Patient is credited with helping define the field of feminist bioethics.

The Politics of Women's Health: Exploring Agency and Autonomy (1998), a co-authored volume that Sherwin coordinated, has been described as "an examination of both the real world of women's health status and health-care delivery in different countries, and the assumptions behind the dominant medical model of solving problems without regard to social conditions". It has received praise as "an excellent, insightful book" with themes including "those of autonomy and agency and the prevalent trend in modern healthcare of concentrating on the patient while ignoring his or her economic and social milieu." Some of this work culminated in recommendations that informed Canada's Tri-Council Policy Statement on Ethical Research Involving Humans.

Sherwin was also involved in establishing the International Journal of Feminist Approaches to Bioethics, and wrote the lead essay for its inaugural issue.

== Awards and honors ==
On 6 May 2015, Sherwin was appointed to the Order of Canada by Governor General David Johnston “for her contributions as a scholar, mentor and leader in the field of feminist bioethics, notably through her writings on discrimination in health care.” Other honours include:

- Doctor of Laws, honoris causa, Dalhousie University, 2017
- Fellow, Canadian Academy of Health Sciences, 2007
- Lifetime Achievement Award, Canadian Bioethics Society, 2007
- Killam Prize in Humanities, 2006
- Distinguished Woman Philosopher, Society for Women in Philosophy, 2004
- Sarah Shorten Award, Canadian Association of University Teachers, 2000
- Fellow, Royal Society of Canada, 1999
- George Munro Professor of Philosophy (Metaphysics), 1999-2002
- President, Dalhousie Faculty Association, 1979-1980
