= The Journal of Medicine and Philosophy =

- Discipline: Bioethics, philosophy, medicine
- Language: English
- Edited by: Mark J. Cherry

Publication details
- History: 1976–present
- Publisher: Oxford University Press
- Frequency: Bimonthly
- Impact factor: 0.854 (2017)

Standard abbreviations
- ISO 4: J. Med. Philos.

Indexing
- CODEN: JMPHDC
- ISSN: 0360-5310 (print); 1744-5019 (web)
- LCCN: 76645815
- OCLC no.: 01909882

Links
- Journal homepage; Online archive

The Journal of Medicine and Philosophy is a bimonthly peer-reviewed medical journal covering bioethics and philosophy of medicine. It was established in 1976 and is published by Oxford University Press. The founding editor-in-chief was Edmund Pellegrino (Georgetown University), and the current one is Mark J. Cherry (St. Edward's University). According to the Journal Citation Reports, the journal has a 2017 impact factor of 0.854.
