= El Bosque University =

University in Bogotá, Colombia

- Universidad El Bosque
- Established: July 27, 1977
- Rector: Maria Clara Rangel Galvis
- Campus: Urban
- Colours: Orange; Dark Green
- Website: www.unbosque.edu.co

The El Bosque University (Spanish: Universidad El Bosque), is a coeducational, nonsectarian private university located in north Bogotá, Colombia. Founded in 1977, the university currently offers 20 undergraduate programs, as well as several specializations, Master's degrees and Doctorates.
