= Bioethics =

Study of the ethical issues emerging from advances in biology and medicine

Bioethics is both a field of study and professional practice, interested in ethical issues related to health (primarily focused on the human, but also increasingly includes animal ethics), including those emerging from advances in biology, medicine, and technologies. It proposes the discussion about moral discernment in society (what decisions are "good" or "bad" and why) and it is often related to medical policy and practice, but also to broader questions as environment, well-being and public health. Bioethics is concerned with the ethical questions that arise in the relationships among life sciences, biotechnology, medicine, politics, law, theology and philosophy. It includes the study of values relating to primary care, other branches of medicine ("the ethics of the ordinary"), ethical education in science, animal, and environmental ethics, and public health.

== Etymology ==
The term bioethics (Greek bios, "life"; ethos, "moral nature, behavior") was coined in 1927 by Fritz Jahr in an article about a "bioethical imperative" regarding the use of animals and plants in scientific research. In 1970, the American biochemist and oncologist Van Rensselaer Potter used the term to describe the relationship between the biosphere and a growing human population. Potter's work laid the foundation for global ethics, a discipline centered around the link between biology, ecology, medicine, and human values. Sargent Shriver, the spouse of Eunice Kennedy Shriver, claimed that he had invented the term "bioethics" in the living room of his home in Bethesda, Maryland, in 1970. He stated that he thought of the word after returning from a discussion earlier that evening at Georgetown University, where he discussed with others a possible Kennedy family sponsorship of an institute focused around the "application of moral philosophy to concrete medical dilemmas".

== Purpose and scope ==
The discipline of bioethics has addressed a wide swathe of human inquiry; ranging from debates over the boundaries of lifestyles (e.g. abortion, euthanasia), surrogacy, the allocation of scarce health care resources (e.g. organ donation, health care rationing), to the right to refuse medical care for religious or cultural reasons. Bioethicists disagree among themselves over the precise limits of their discipline, debating whether the field should concern itself with the ethical evaluation of all questions involving biology and medicine, or only a subset of these questions. Some bioethicists would narrow ethical evaluation only to the morality of medical treatments or technological innovations, and the timing of medical treatment of humans. Others would increase the scope of moral assessment to encompass the morality of all moves that would possibly assist or damage organisms capable of feeling fear.

The scope of bioethics has evolved past mere biotechnology to include topics such as cloning, gene therapy, life extension, human genetic engineering, astroethics and life in space, and manipulation of basic biology through altered DNA, XNA and proteins. These (and other) developments may affect future evolution and require new principles that address life at its core, such as biotic ethics that values life itself at its basic biological processes and structures, and seeks their propagation. Moving beyond the biological, issues raised in public health such as vaccination and resource allocation have also encouraged the development of novel ethics frameworks to address such challenges. A study published in 2022 based on the corpus of full papers from eight main bioethics journals demonstrated the heterogeneity of this field by distinguishing 91 topics that have been discussed in these journals over the past half a century.

== Principles ==
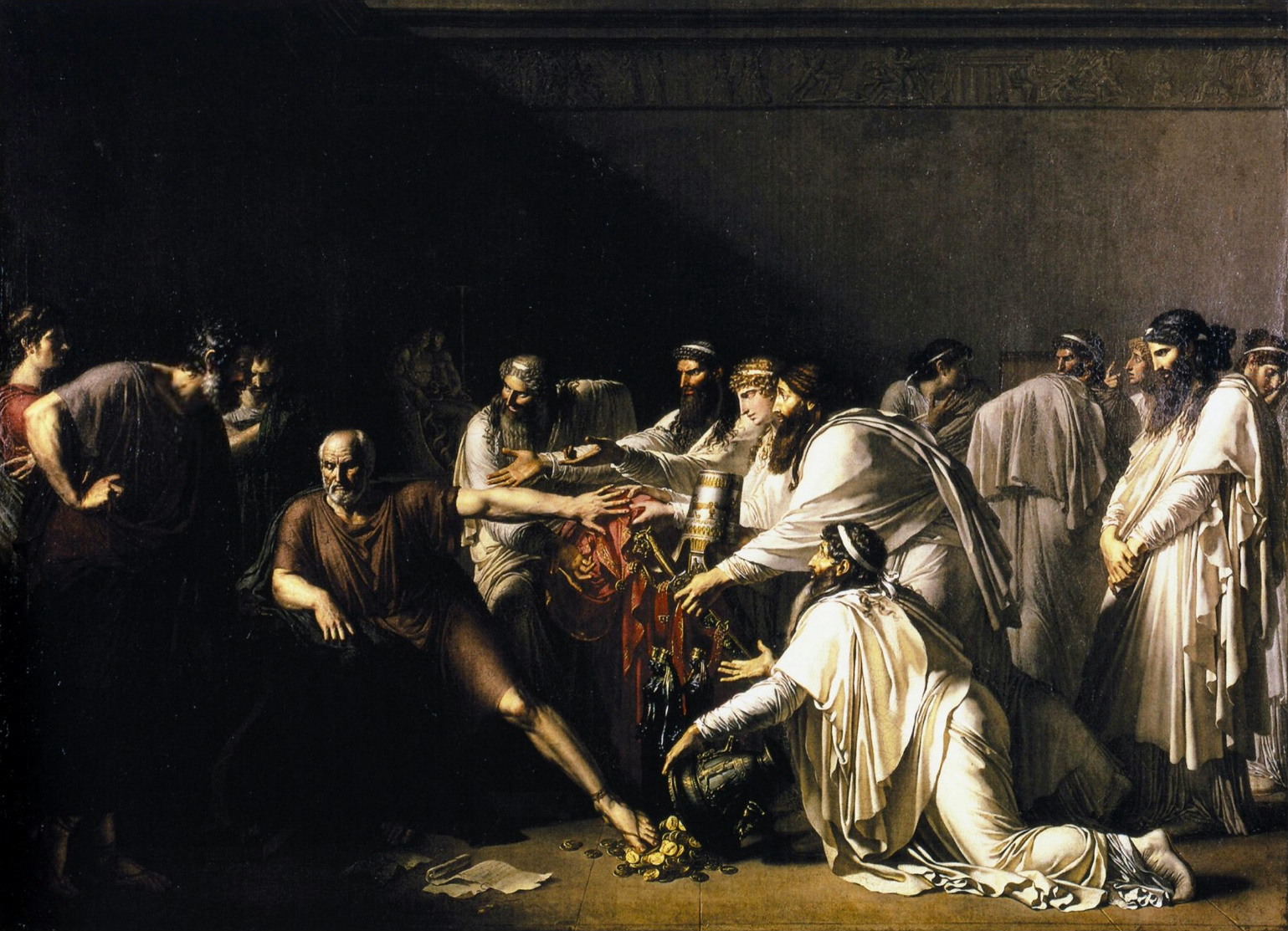
Hippocrates Refusing the Gifts of Artaxerxes by Anne-Louis Girodet-Trioson, 1792

One of the first areas addressed by modern bioethicists was human experimentation. According to the Declaration of Helsinki (1964) published by the World Medical Association, the essential principles in medical research involving human subjects are autonomy, beneficence, non-maleficence, and justice. The autonomy of individuals to make decisions while assuming responsibility for them and respecting the autonomy of others ought to be respected. For people unable to exercise their autonomy, special measures ought to be taken to protect their rights and interests.

In US, the National Commission for the Protection of Human Subjects of Biomedical and Behavioral Research was initially established in 1974 to identify the basic ethical principles that should underlie the conduct of biomedical and behavioral research involving human subjects. However, the fundamental principles announced in the Belmont Report (1979)—namely, respect for persons, beneficence and justice—have influenced the thinking of bioethicists across a wide range of issues. Others have added non-maleficence, human dignity, and the sanctity of life to this list of cardinal values. Overall, the Belmont Report has guided research in a course centered on defending difficult topics as properly as pushing for transparency between the researcher and the subject. Research has flourished within the past 40 years and due to the advance in technology, it is thought that human subjects have outgrown the Belmont Report, and the need for revision is desired.

Another essential precept of bioethics is its placement of cost on dialogue and presentation. Numerous dialogue based bioethics organizations exist in universities throughout the United States to champion precisely such goals. Examples include the Ohio State Bioethics Society and the Bioethics Society of Cornell. Professional level versions of these organizations also exist.

Many bioethicists, in particular scientific scholars, accord the easiest precedence to autonomy. They trust that every affected person ought to decide which direction of motion they think about most in line with their beliefs. In other words, the patient should always have the freedom to choose their own treatment.

== Medical ethics ==
Ethics affects medical decisions made by healthcare providers and patients. Medical ethics is the study of moral values and judgments as they apply to medicine. The four main moral commitments are respect for autonomy, beneficence, nonmaleficence, and justice. Using these four principles and thinking about what the physicians' specific concern is for their scope of practice can help physicians make moral decisions. As a scholarly discipline, medical ethics includes its practical application in clinical settings as well as work on its history, philosophy, theology, and sociology. It is concerned with the duties that doctors, hospitals, and other healthcare providers have to patients, society, and other health professionals.

Medical ethics tends to be understood narrowly as applied professional ethics; whereas bioethics has a more expansive application, touching upon the philosophy of science and issues of biotechnology. The two fields often overlap, and the distinction is more so a matter of style than professional consensus. Medical ethics shares many principles with other branches of healthcare ethics, such as nursing ethics. A bioethicist assists the health care and research community in examining moral issues involved in our understanding of life and death, and resolving ethical dilemmas in medicine and science. Examples of this would be the topic of equality in medicine, the intersection of cultural practices and medical care, ethical distribution of healthcare resources in pandemics, and issues of bioterrorism.

== Medical sociology ==
The practice of bioethics in clinical care have been studied by medical sociology. Many scholars consider that bioethics arose in response to a perceived lack of accountability in medical care in the 1970s. Studying the clinical practice of ethics in medical care, Hauschildt and Vries found that ethical questions were often reframed as clinical judgments to allow clinicians to make decisions. Ethicists most often put key decisions in the hands of physicians rather than patients.

Communication strategies suggested by ethicists act to decrease patient autonomy. Examples include, clinicians discussing treatment options with one another prior to talking to patients or their family to present a united front limited patient autonomy, hiding uncertainty amongst clinicians. Decisions about overarching goals of treatment were reframed as technical matters excluding patients and their families. Palliative care experts were used as intermediaries to guide patients towards less invasive end-of-live treatment. In their study, Hauschild and Vries found that 76% of ethical consultants were trained as clinicians.

Studying informed consent, Corrigan found that some social processes resulted in limitations to patients choice, but also at times patients could find questions regarding consent to medical trials burdensome.

The most prevalent subject is how social stratification (based on socioeconomic status, gender, class, ethnicity, and age) affects patterns of behavior related to health and sickness, illness risk, disability, and other outcomes related to health care. The study of health care organization and provision, which encompasses the evolving organizational structures of health care organizations and the social psychology of health and health care, is another important approach. These latter research cover topics including connections between doctors and patients, coping mechanisms, and social support. The description of other important fields of medical sociology study emphasizes how theory and research have changed in the twenty-first century.

== Value pluralism ==
Bioethicists come from a wide variety of backgrounds and have training in a diverse array of disciplines. The field contains individuals trained in philosophy such as Deryck Beyleveld of Durham University, Daniel Brock of Harvard University, Baruch Brody of Rice University, Arthur Caplan of NYU, Joseph Fins of Cornell University, Frances Kamm of Rutgers University, Daniel Callahan of the Hastings Center, Peter Singer of Princeton University, and Julian Savulescu of the University of Oxford; medically trained clinician ethicists such as Mark Siegler of the University of Chicago; lawyers such as Nancy Dubler of Albert Einstein College of Medicine and Jerry Menikoff of the federal Office for Human Research Protections; political scientists like Francis Fukuyama; religious studies scholars including James Childress; and theologians like Lisa Sowle Cahill and Stanley Hauerwas.

The field, formerly dominated by formally trained philosophers, has become increasingly interdisciplinary, with some critics even claiming that the methods of analytic philosophy have harmed the field's development. Leading journals in the field include The Journal of Medicine and Philosophy, the Hastings Center Report, the American Journal of Bioethics, the Journal of Medical Ethics, Bioethics, the Kennedy Institute of Ethics Journal, Public Health Ethics, and the Cambridge Quarterly of Healthcare Ethics. Bioethics has also benefited from the process philosophy developed by Alfred North Whitehead.

Another discipline that discusses bioethics is the field of feminism; the International Journal of Feminist Approaches to Bioethics has played a role in organizing and legitimizing feminist work in bioethics.

Many religious communities have their histories of inquiry into bioethical issues and have developed rules and guidelines on how to deal with these issues from within the viewpoint of their respective faiths. The Jewish, Christian and Muslim faiths have each developed a considerable body of literature on these matters. In the case of many non-Western cultures, a strict separation of religion from philosophy does not exist. In many Asian cultures, for example, there is a lively discussion on bioethical issues. Buddhist bioethics, in general, is characterized by a naturalistic outlook that leads to a rationalistic, pragmatic approach. Buddhist bioethicists include Damien Keown. In India, Vandana Shiva is a leading bioethicist speaking from the Hindu tradition.

In Africa, and partly also in Latin America, the debate on bioethics frequently focuses on its practical relevance in the context of underdevelopment and geopolitical power relations. In Africa, their bioethical approach is influenced by and similar to Western bioethics due to the colonization of many African countries. Some African bioethicists are calling for a shift in bioethics that utilizes indigenous African philosophy rather than Western philosophy. Some African bioethicists also believe that Africans will be more likely to accept a bioethical approach grounded in their own culture, as well as empower African people.

Masahiro Morioka argues that in Japan the bioethics movement was first launched by disability activists and feminists in the early 1970s, while academic bioethics began in the mid-1980s. During this period, unique philosophical discussions on brain death and disability appeared both in the academy and journalism. In Chinese culture and bioethics, there is not as much of an emphasis on autonomy as opposed to the heavy emphasis placed on autonomy in Western bioethics. Community, social values, and family are all heavily valued in Chinese culture, and contribute to the lack of emphasis on autonomy in Chinese bioethics. The Chinese believe that the family, community, and individual are all interdependent of each other, so it is common for the family unit to collectively make decisions regarding healthcare and medical decisions for a loved one, instead of an individual making an independent decision for his or her self.

Some argue that spirituality and understanding one another as spiritual beings and moral agents is an important aspect of bioethics, and that spirituality and bioethics are heavily intertwined with one another. As a healthcare provider, it is important to know and understand varying world views and religious beliefs. Having this knowledge and understanding can empower healthcare providers with the ability to better treat and serve their patients. Developing a connection and understanding of a patient's moral agent helps enhance the care provided to the patient. Without this connection or understanding, patients can be at risk of becoming "faceless units of work" and being looked at as a "set of medical conditions" as opposed to the storied and spiritual beings that they are.

=== Islamic bioethics ===
Islamic bioethics focuses on religious duties and obligations, such as seeking treatment and preserving life. Islamic bioethics is heavily influenced and connected to the teachings of the Qur'an as well as the teachings of Muhammad. These influences essentially make it an extension of Shariah or Islamic Law. In Islamic bioethics, passages from the Qur'an are often used to validate various medical practices. For example, a passage from the Qur'an states "whosoever killeth a human being ... it shall be as if he had killed all humankind, and whosoever saveth the life of one, it shall be as if he saved the life of all humankind." This excerpt can be used to encourage using medicine and medical practices to save lives, but can also be looked at as a protest against euthanasia and assisted suicide. A high value and worth are placed on human life in Islam, and in turn, human life is deeply valued in the practice of Islamic bioethics as well. Muslims believe all human life, even one of poor quality, needs to be given appreciation and must be cared for and conserved.

To react to new technological and medical advancements, informed Islamic jurists regularly hold conferences to discuss new bioethical issues and come to an agreement on where they stand on the issue from an Islamic perspective. This allows Islamic bioethics to respond to new advancements in medicine. The standpoints taken by Islamic jurists on bioethical issues are not always unanimous decisions. There is much diversity among Muslims, varying from country to country and the different degrees to which they adhere by Shariah. Differences and disagreements in regards to jurisprudence, theology, and ethics between the two main branches of Islam, Sunni, and Shia, lead to differences in the methods and ways in which Islamic bioethics is practiced throughout the Islamic world. An area where there is a lack of consensus is brain death. The Organization of Islamic Conferences Islamic Fiqh Academy (OIC-IFA) holds the view that brain death is equivalent to cardiopulmonary death, and acknowledges brain death in an individual as the individual being deceased. On the contrary, the Islamic Organization of Medical Sciences (IOMS) states that brain death is an "intermediate state between life and death" and does not acknowledge a brain dead individual as being deceased.

Islamic bioethics is strongly against abortion and strictly prohibits it. The IOMS states that "from the moment a zygote settles inside a woman's body, it deserves a unanimously recognized degree of respect." Abortion may only be permitted in unique situations where it is considered to be the "lesser evil".

Islamic bioethics is founded on the Qur'an, the Sunnah, and reason (al-'aql), much like any other inquiry into Islam. Sunni Muslims may use terms like ijmaa' (consensus) and qiyas in place of reason (analogy). Ijmaa' and qiyas as such are not recognized by Shi'a since they are insufficient proofs on their own.

=== Christian bioethics ===
In Christian bioethics it is noted that the Bible, especially the New Testament, teaches about healing by faith. Healing in the Bible is often associated with the ministry of specific individuals including Elijah, Jesus and Paul. Being healed has been described as a privilege of accepting Christ's redemption on the cross. Jesus endorsed the use of the medical assistance of the time (medicines of oil and wine).

The principle of the sacredness of human life is at the basis of Catholic bioethics. On the subject of abortion, for example, Catholics and Orthodox are on very similar positions. Catholic bioethics insists on this concept, without exception, while Anglicans, Waldensians and Lutherans have positions closer to secular ones, for example with regard to the end of life.

In 1936, Ludwig Bieler argued that Jesus was stylized in the New Testament in the image of the "divine man" (Greek: theios aner), which was widespread in antiquity. It is said that many of the famous rulers and elders of the time had divine healing powers.

Contemporary bioethical and health care policy issues, including abortion, the distribution of limited resources, the nature of appropriate hospital chaplaincy, fetal experimentation, the use of fetal tissue in treatment, genetic engineering, the use of critical care units, distinctions between ordinary and extraordinary treatment, euthanasia, free and informed consent, competency determinations, the meaning of life, are being examined within the framework of traditional Christian moral commitments.

=== Feminist bioethics ===
Feminist bioethics critiques the fields of bioethics and medicine for its lack of inclusion of women's and other marginalized group's perspectives. This lack of perspective from women is thought to create power imbalances that favor men. These power imbalances are theorized to be created from the androcentric nature of medicine. One example of a lack of consideration of women is in clinical drug trials that exclude women due to hormonal fluctuations and possible future birth defects. This has led to a gap in the research on how pharmaceuticals can affect women. Feminist bioethicists call for the necessity of feminist approaches to bioethics because the lack of diverse perspectives in bioethics and medicine can cause preventable harm to already vulnerable groups.

This study first gained prevalence in the field of reproductive medicine as it was viewed as a "woman's issue". Since then, feminist approaches to bioethics has expanded to include bioethical topics in mental health, disability advocacy, healthcare accessibility, and pharmaceuticals. Lindemann notes the need for the future agenda of feminist approaches to bioethics to expand further to include healthcare organizational ethics, genetics, stem cell research, and more.

Notable figures in feminist bioethics include Carol Gilligan, Susan Sherwin, and the creators of the International Journal of Feminist Approaches to Bioethics, Mary C. Rawlinson and Anne Donchin. Sherwin's book No Longer Patient: Feminist Ethics in Health Care (1992) is credited with being one of the first full-length books published on the topic of feminist bioethics and points out the shortcomings in then-current bioethical theories. Sherwin's viewpoint incorporates models of oppression within healthcare that intend to further marginalize women, people of color, immigrants, and people with disabilities. Since created in 1992, the International Journal of Feminist Approaches to Bioethics has done much work to legitimize feminist work and theory in bioethics.

In 2001, American professor Mary C. Rawlinson published The Concept of A Feminist Bioethics, an article criticizing traditional male-centric views on ethics. Rawlinson points out that traditional philosophical thought centralizes men and leaves women as an "other" or an accessory to men. As a result, the philosophy of "feminist bioethics" contradicts bioethics because women's rights are seen as a separate order from human rights. Finally, Rawlinson makes several recommendations for how women's experiences and bodies could reshape fundamental ethical principles, including acceptance, mutual respect, and the establishment of bodily autonomy for women.

=== Environmental bioethics ===
Bioethics, the ethics of the life sciences in general, expanded from the encounter between experts in medicine and the laity, to include organizational and social ethics, environmental ethics. As of 2019 textbooks of green bioethics existed.Particular emphasis on responsibility toward ecosystems, including resource conservation, environmental protection, and considerations of intergenerational justice.

=== Animal bioethics ===
Main Article: Animal ethics

Animal bioethics is the study of animal-human dynamics, and how animals should be treated by humans. In a scientific framework, ethical issues of consideration include animal testing and eponymous taxonomy (the ethics of naming species after people). Biologists W. M. S. Russell and R. L. Burch developed the "3 Rs", a set of 3 guidelines outlining recommended procedures to promote animal respect and reduce the amount of animals used in scientific research. They include determining alternatives to animal use (replacement), minimizing the number of animals used (reduction), and mitigating animal suffering if they are used in research (refinement).

==== Eponymous taxonomy ====
Taxonomy is the classification of animals in biological disciplines. Some species such as Aleiodes gaga are named after real people, which can be controversial, as in the case of Anophthalmus hitleri, a species of beetle hunted to endangerment by Nazi memorabilia collectors. Critics of eponymic naming conventions such as Guedes et al. argue that eponymous taxonomy is a form of scientific colonization because scientists from colonizing nations often had a stake in naming species native to countries in the Global South. Supporters of eponymous taxa argue that “famous” taxonomies are important for conservation efforts, as species of interest would be brought to public attention.

=== Gene therapy ethics ===
Gene therapy involves ethics, because scientists are making changes to genes, the building blocks of the human body. Currently, therapeutic gene therapy is available to treat specific genetic disorders by editing cells in specific body parts. For example, gene therapy can treat hematopoietic disease. There is also a controversial gene therapy called "germline gene therapy", in which genes in a sperm or egg can be edited to prevent genetic disorder in the future generation. It is unknown how this type of gene therapy affects long-term human development. In the United States, federal funding cannot be used to research germline gene therapy.

Gene therapy, like any other treatment, has several advantages and ethical problems. Currently, the majority of gene therapies are a one time treatment rather than continuous prescribed drugs, and instead of treating symptoms, it can address the underlying cause of a genetic illness. It works best on diseases caused by a change in a single gene, like inherited blood disorders, for instance, sickle cell and hemophilia. Gene therapy is still in its early stages and carries risks or limitations such as availability due to costs and access to technology, targeting of the wrong cells, certain types of cancer, and adverse reactions to your immune system.

== Professional practice ==
Bioethics as a subject of expert exercise (although now not a formal profession) developed at the beginning in North America in the 1980s and 1990s, in the areas of clinical ethics, medical ethics and research ethics. Slowly internationalizing as a field, since the 2000s, professional bioethics has expanded to include other specialties, such as organizational ethics in health systems, public health ethics, and more recently ethics of artificial intelligence. Professional ethicists may be called consultants, ethicists, coordinators, or even analysts; and they may work in healthcare organizations, government agencies, and in both the public and private sectors. They may also be full-time employees, unbiased consultants, or have cross-appointments with educational institutions, such as lookup centres or universities.

== Models of bioethics ==
American ethicists Tom Beauchamp and James Childress developed Principles of Biomedical Ethics, a set of four principles that include autonomy, nonmaleficence (avoiding harm), beneficence (doing good), and justice. Today, the four principles are used by bioethicists to assess ethical considerations such as childhood vaccinations and patient autonomy. One facet of the principles that Beauchamp and Childress defend is the idea that a set of universal morals can be created and applied to a given situation. Critics of this philosophy argue that it is not possible to assign universal morality to social values.

According to Ihor Boyko, three models of bioethics are described in the Ukrainian bioethics literature: liberal, utilitarian and personalistic.

- Model 1 is "liberal" when there are no restrictions.
- Model 2 is "utilitarian", when what is prohibited is allowed for one person or a group of persons, if it is useful and beneficial for the majority of people.
- Model 3 is "personalistic", where the human person is considered an inviolable integrity.

== Learned societies and professional associations ==
The field of bioethics has developed national and international learned societies and professional associations, such as the American Society for Bioethics and Humanities, the Canadian Bioethics Society, the Canadian Association of Research Ethics Boards, the Association of Bioethics Program Directors, the Bangladesh Bioethics Society and the International Association of Bioethics.

== Education ==
Bioethics is taught in courses at the undergraduate and graduate level in different academic disciplines or programs, such as Philosophy, Medicine, Law, Social Sciences. It has become a requirement for professional accreditation in many health professional programs (Medicine, Nursing, Rehabilitation), to have obligatory training in ethics (e.g., professional ethics, medical ethics, clinical ethics, nursing ethics). Interest in the field and professional opportunities have led to the development of dedicated programs with concentrations in Bioethics, largely in the United States, Canada (List of Canadian bioethics programs) and Europe, offering undergraduate majors/minors, graduate certificates, and master's and doctoral degrees.

Training in bioethics (usually clinical, medical, or professional ethics) are part of core competency requirements for health professionals in fields such as nursing, medicine or rehabilitation. For example, every medical school in Canada teaches bioethics so that students can gain an understanding of biomedical ethics and use the knowledge gained in their future careers to provide better patient care. Canadian residency training programs are required to teach bioethics as it is one of the conditions of accreditation, and is a requirement by the College of Family Physicians of Canada and by the Royal College of Physicians and Surgeons of Canada.

== Criticism ==
As a field of study, bioethics has also drawn criticism. For instance, Paul Farmer noted that bioethics tends to focus its attention on problems that arise from "too much care" for patients in industrialized nations while giving little or no attention to the ethical problem of too little care for the poor. Farmer characterizes the bioethics of handling morally difficult clinical situations, normally in hospitals in industrialized countries, as "quandary ethics". He does not regard quandary ethics and clinical bioethics as unimportant; he argues, rather, that bioethics must be balanced and give due weight to the poor.

Additionally, bioethics has been condemned for its lack of diversity in thought, particularly concerning race. Even as the field has grown to include the areas of public opinion, policymaking, and medical decision-making, little to no academic writing has been authored concerning the intersection between race–especially the cultural values imbued in that construct–and bioethical literature. John Hoberman illustrates this in a 2016 critique, in which he points out that bioethicists have been traditionally resistant to expanding their discourse to include sociological and historically relevant applications. Central to this is the notion of white normativity, which establishes the dominance of white hegemonic structures in bioethical academia and tends to reinforce existing biases.

These points and critiques, along with the neglect of women's perspectives within bioethics, have also been discussed amongst feminist bioethical scholars.

However, differing views on bioethics' lack of diversity of thought and social inclusivity have also been advanced. For example, one historian has argued that the diversity of thought and social inclusivity are the two essential cornerstones of bioethics, albeit they have not been fully realized.

Advocates of critical bioethics argue that the practice must be grounded in empirical research, factual refutation, ongoing self-reflection, and skepticism towards conventional assertions in medicine and science.

== Issues ==
Research in bioethics is conducted by a broad and interdisciplinary community of scholars, and is not restricted only to those researchers who define themselves as "bioethicists": it includes researchers from the humanities, social sciences, health sciences and health professions, law, the fundamental sciences, etc. These researchers may be working in specialized bioethics centers and institutes associated with university bioethics training programs; but they may also be based in disciplinary departments without a specific bioethics focus. Notable examples of research centers include, amongst others, The Hastings Center, the Kennedy Institute of Ethics, the Yale Interdisciplinary Center for Bioethics, the Centre for Human Bioethics.

Areas of bioethics research that are the subject of published, peer-reviewed bioethical analysis include:

- Abortion
- Alternative medicine
- Animal rights
- Applied ethics
- Artificial insemination
- Artificial life
- Artificial womb
- Assisted suicide
- Biocentrism
- Biological agent
- Biological patent
- Biopiracy
- Biorisk
- Blood transfusion
- Body modification
- Brain–computer interface
- Chimeras
- Circumcision
- Cloning
- Cognitive liberty
- Confidentiality (medical records)
- Conflict of interest in the healthcare industry
- Consent
- Contraception (birth control)
- Cryonics
- Disability
- Ecocide
- End-of-life care
- Eugenics
- Euthanasia (human, non-human animal)
- Exorcism
- Faith healing
- Feeding tube
- Gain-of-function research
- Gene theft
- Gene therapy
- Genetic testing
- Genetically modified food
- Genetically modified organism
- Genomics
- Great Ape Project
- HeLa cells
- Human cloning
- Human enhancement
- Human experimentation in the United States
- Human genetic engineering
- Human population planning
- Iatrogenesis
- Infertility treatments
- Intersex
- Life extension
- Life support
- Lobotomy
- Medicalization
- Medical malpractice
- Medical research
- Medical torture
- Mediation
- Mitochondrial donation
- Moral obligation
- Moral status of animals
- Nanomedicine
- Neuroethics
- Neuroenhancement
- Nazi human experimentation
- Ordinary and extraordinary care
- Overtreatment
- Organ donation
- Organ transplant
- Pain management
- Parthenogenesis
- Patients' Bill of Rights
- Placebo
- Pharmacogenetics
- Political abuse of psychiatry
- Population control (non-human animals)
- Prescription drug prices in the United States
- Procreative beneficence
- Professional ethics
- Psychosurgery
- Quality of life (healthcare)
- Quaternary prevention
- Recreational drug use
- Reproductive rights
- Reproductive technology
- Reprogenetics
- Research ethics
- Resource allocation
- Sex reassignment therapy
- Sperm and egg donation
- Spiritual drug use
- Stem cell research
- Sterilization (medicine)
- Suicide
- Surrogacy
- Transsexuality
- Transhumanism
- Transplant trade
- Triage
- Tubal ligation
- Vaccination controversy
- Xenotransfusion
- Xenotransplantation

== See also ==
- List of bioethics centers and institutes
- List of bioethics journals
- List of Canadian bioethics programs
- Biotechnology risk – Existential threat from biological sources
- Cytoplasmic transfer – Special form of in vitro fertilisation
- The Hastings Center – American nonprofit bioethics research institute
- Medical law – Area of law dealing with the practice of medicine
- Neuroethics – Ethics of neuroscience, and the neuroscience of ethics
- Preimplantation genetic diagnosis – Genetic profiling of embryos prior to implantation
- Resources for clinical ethics consultation
- The Convention on Human Rights and Biomedicine – International treaty
