= List of bioethics journals =

This is a list of peer-reviewed academic journals covering the field of bioethics. Developed with reference to the 2015 list of Top 100 Bioethics Journals in the World, and Where to publish and not to publish in bioethics.

== A ==
- Accountability in Research
- AMA Journal of Ethics
- American Journal of Bioethics
- American Journal of Law & Medicine

== B ==
- Bioethics
- Biology and Philosophy
- BioSocieties
- BMC Medical Ethics

== C ==
- Canadian Journal of Bioethics
- Cambridge Quarterly of Healthcare Ethics
- Clinical Ethics

== D ==
- Developing World Bioethics

== E ==
- Environmental Values
- Ethical Theory and Moral Practice
- European Journal of Health Law
- Environmental Ethics

== H ==
- Hastings Center Report

== I ==
- Indian Journal of Medical Ethics
- International Journal of Feminist Approaches to Bioethics
- IRB: Ethics & Human Research

== J ==
- Journal of Agricultural and Environmental Ethics
- Journal of Bioethical Inquiry
- Journal of Empirical Research on Human Research Ethics
- Journal of Law, Medicine & Ethics
- Journal of Medical Ethics
- Journal of Value Inquiry

== K ==
- Kennedy Institute of Ethics Journal

== L ==
- The Linacre Quarterly

== M ==
- Medicine, Health Care and Philosophy

== N ==
- Narrative Inquiry in Bioethics
- The National Catholic Bioethics Quarterly
- Neuroethics
- The New Bioethics
- New Genetics and Society
- Notre Dame Journal of Law, Ethics & Public Policy
- Nursing Ethics

== P ==
- Public Health Ethics
- Pediatric Ethicscope: The Journal of Pediatric Bioethics

== S ==
- Science and Engineering Ethics
- Science, Technology, & Human Values

== T ==
- Theoretical Medicine and Bioethics

== Y ==
- Yale Journal of Health Policy, Law, and Ethics
