= Scientific language =

Scientific language may refer to:

- Scientific language (linguistic classification), the specific prose and style that is used when discussing or creating science
- Languages of science, languages that are used commonly in mainstream science
