= CJB =

CJB may refer to:

- Canadian Journal of Bioethics
- Cheongju Broadcasting
- Coimbatore International Airport, IATA code CJB
- Communist Youth Movement (Netherlands)
- Complete Jewish Bible
- Criminal Justice Bill, United Kingdom, passed into law as the Criminal Justice Act 1994
