= Bryn Williams-Jones =

Canadian bioethicist (born 1972)

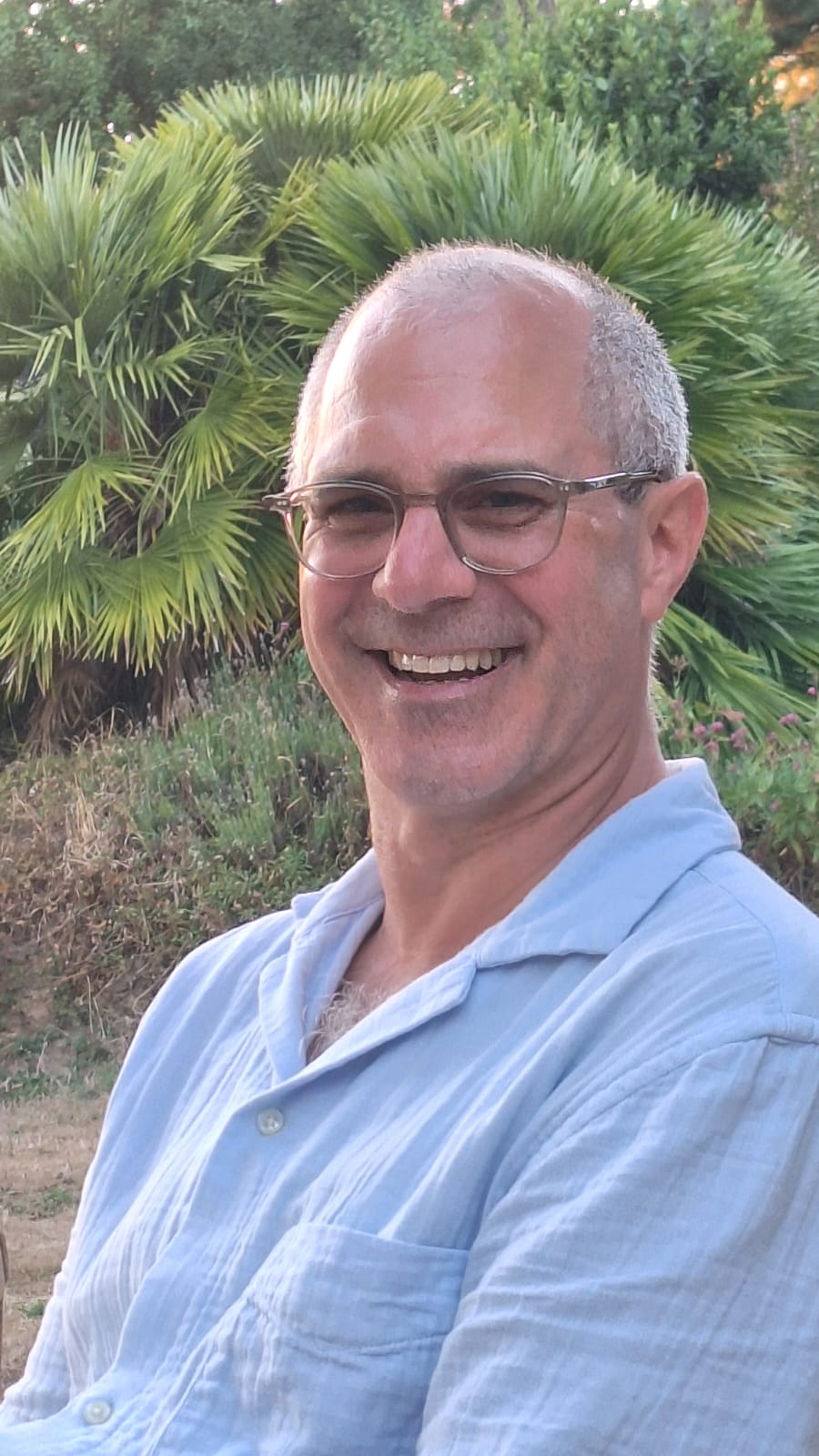
- Williams-Jones in 2026
- Born: 1972 (age 53–54); Kingston, Ontario
- Education: PhD
- Alma mater: McGill University, University of British Columbia, University of Cambridge
- Awards: Georges-A. Legault Prize in Organizational Ethics 2019, Academic Category, Institute of Applied Ethics (IDÉA), Université Laval
- Scientific career
- Fields: Bioethics, Professional ethics, Research integrity
- Institutions: Bioethics Program, School of Public Health, Université de Montréal
- Doctoral advisor: Michael M. Burgess
- Website: Academic CV

Bryn Williams-Jones is a Canadian bioethicist and professor at the Université de Montréal. His work focuses on conflicts of interest, research integrity, and the governance of health research and innovation. In parallel with his academic research, he has developed a body of public-facing scholarship, including open access books and essays aimed at making bioethics accessible beyond academic audiences.

Williams-Jones is co-founder and editor-in-chief of the Canadian Journal of Bioethics/Revue canadienne de bioéthique, a bilingual open access bioethics journal. He is also a fellow of The Hastings Center.

== Education ==
Williams-Jones completed a bachelor's degree in Philosophy and a Masters in Religious Studies (bioethics specialization) at McGill University. He then pursued a PhD in Interdisciplinary studies (bioethics) at the W. Maurice Young Centre for Applied Ethics at the University of British Columbia, where his research focused on issues of genetics and ethics. He subsequently did a post-doctoral fellowship at the Centre for Family Research, at the University of Cambridge, and was a junior research fellow at Homerton College. He later worked as a research ethicist at Cardiff University, before joining the Université de Montréal.

== Career and institutional roles ==
Williams-Jones is a professor in the School of Public Health at Université de Montréal. From 2010 to 2022 he directed the Bioethics Program, and in 2020 he was appointed Director of the Department of Social and Preventive Medicine.

His institutional work has included contributions to research governance and the development of policies related to research integrity and conflicts of interest. He has served on university research ethics committees and on advisory committees for national organizations including the Canadian Institutes of Health Research, the Social Sciences and Humanities Research Council of Canada, Genome Canada, and the Quebec National Institute for Excellence in Health and Social Services (INESSS).

== Research and contributions ==
Williams-Jones’ research examines the ethical and institutional challenges associated with conflicts of interest in academic and health research. His work analyzes how financial, professional, and institutional relationships shape research practices, influence knowledge production, and affect public trust.

A central aspect of his scholarship is the development of practical frameworks and governance tools for identifying, assessing, and managing conflicts of interest. He has argued that such conflicts are not exceptional anomalies but structural features of contemporary research environments, requiring context-sensitive and institutionally grounded approaches to management.

His publications span public health policy, science and technology innovation, and research integrity, with contributions addressing areas such as genetics, pharmaceutical development, and emerging health technologies.

== Public scholarship and open access work ==
In addition to his academic publications, Williams-Jones has developed a body of public-facing work aimed at broadening access to bioethical analysis.

He is the author of the bilingual open access book Playing the Academic Game / Jouer le jeu académique, which offers practical guidance on life in academic institutions, and edited the open access volume Navigating Conflicts of Interest in Academia, published in English, French, and Portuguese. In addition to analytical and policy-oriented writing, he has also published a satirical book, The Committee of Eternal Deliberation, in English and French, which reflects on academic life and institutional practices.

== Media and public engagement ==
Williams-Jones has contributed to public discussions on health policy, research ethics, and academic governance through interviews and commentary in outlets including LaPresse, CBC, Le Devoir, Toronto Star, National Post. He has also appeared on radio and television programs such as Tout le monde en parle, ICI Radio-Canada, and CBC Newsworld.
