= Canadian Journal of Bioethics =

- Discipline: Bioethics
- Language: English, French
- Edited by: Bryn Williams-Jones

Publication details
- Former name: BioéthiqueOnline
- History: 2012–present
- Publisher: Programmes de éthique, École de santé publique de l'Université de Montréal (Canada)
- Frequency: Quarterly
- Open access: Yes
- License: Creative Commons Attribution 4.0 International License

Standard abbreviations
- ISO 4: Can. J. Bioeth.

Indexing
- ISSN: 2561-4665
- OCLC no.: 1033596143
- BioéthiqueOnline
- ISSN: 1923-2799

Links
- Journal homepage; Online archive; BioéthiqueOnline archive

The Canadian Journal of Bioethics (French: Revue canadienne de bioéthique) is a peer-reviewed open-access academic journal hosted by the Bioethics Program at the School of Public Health, Université de Montréal. It covers all aspects of bioethics in French or English. The founding and current editor-in-chief is Bryn Williams-Jones (Université de Montréal). The journal was established in 2012 as BioéthiqueOnline, obtaining its current title in 2018.

== Publishing and financing ==
The journal publishes under a Creative Commons License, in collaboration with Université de Montréal Libraries and the non-profit consortium Érudit, and is supported by grants from the Canadian Social Sciences and Humanities Research Council (SSHRC), Érudit and the Canadian Research Knowledge Network (CRKN).

== Abstracting and indexing ==
The journal is abstracted and indexed in:

- BASE (search engine)
- CNKI
- Directory of Open Access Journals
- EBSCO Industries
- ERIH Plus
- Érudit
- Gale (publisher)
- Google Scholar
- HAL (open archive)
- HeinOnline
- United States National Library of Medicine
- Philosopher's Information Center
- PhilPapers,
- Scopus
- Ulrich's Periodicals Directory
- Web of Science
- WorldCat,

== See also ==
- List of bioethics journals
- List of open-access journals
