= Developing World Bioethics =

- Discipline: Bioethics, philosophy
- Language: English
- Edited by: Debora Diniz, Udo Schüklenk

Publication details
- History: 2001–present
- Publisher: Wiley
- Frequency: Monthly
- Open access: Hybrid
- Impact factor: 2.2 (2022)

Standard abbreviations
- ISO 4: Dev. World Bioeth.

Indexing
- ISSN: 1471-8731 (print); 1471-8847 (web)
- OCLC no.: 47207188

Links
- Journal homepage; Online access; Online archive

Developing World Bioethics is a monthly peer-reviewed academic journal published by Wiley. The editors-in-chief are Debora Diniz (University of Brazil) and Udo Schüklenk (Queen's University at Kingston). It is a companion journal of Bioethics and covers all aspects of bioethical issues in the developing world.

== Abstracting and indexing ==
The journal is abstracted and indexed in:

- CINAHL
- Current Contents/Social and Behavioral Sciences
- EBSCO databases
- Embase
- Index Medicus/MEDLINE/PubMed
- International Bibliography of the Social Sciences
- ProQuest databases
- PsycINFO
- Science Citation Index Expanded
- Scopus
- Social Sciences Citation Index

According to the Journal Citation Reports, the journal has a 2022 impact factor of 2.2.

== See also ==
- List of ethics journals
