= Yale Journal of Health Policy, Law, and Ethics =

- Discipline: Law, Medicine
- Language: English
- Edited by: Carolyn Lye

Publication details
- History: 2001-present
- Publisher: Yale Law School (United States)
- Frequency: Biannual

Standard abbreviations
- Bluebook: Yale J. Health Pol'y L. & Ethics
- ISO 4: Yale J. Health Policy Law Ethics

Indexing
- ISSN: 1535-3532

Links
- Journal homepage

The Yale Journal of Health Policy, Law, and Ethics is a biannual publication of the Yale Law School, Yale School of Medicine, Yale School of Public Health, and Yale School of Nursing. The Journal publishes articles, essays, notes, and commentaries that cover a wide range of topics in health policy, health law, and biomedical ethics. Its readership includes academicians, professionals, policy makers and legislators in health care. Submissions are peer-reviewed by a distinguished Advisory Board consisting of leading experts in health policy, health law, and biomedical ethics. The Journal is produced and edited by students members from Yale's graduate and professional schools. The Journal is one of the most cited legal publications in the world within the field of Health, Medicine, Psychology and Psychiatry Law. The current editor-in-chief is Carolyn Lye.

== Notable advisory board members ==
- David A. Kessler, former Commissioner of the Food and Drug Administration
- Henry J. Aaron
- Lori Andrews
- George Annas
- Elyn Saks
- Larry Gostin
- Christine Grady
- Timothy Jost
