= Journal of Bioethical Inquiry =

- Discipline: Bioethics
- Language: English
- Edited by: Michael Ashby, Brownen Morrell

Publication details
- History: 2004–present
- Publisher: Springer Science+Business Media
- Frequency: Quarterly
- Impact factor: 1.425 (2019)

Standard abbreviations
- ISO 4: J. Bioethical Inq.

Indexing
- ISSN: 1176-7529 (print); 1872-4353 (web)
- LCCN: 20133576
- OCLC no.: 303457520

Links
- Journal homepage; Online archive

The Journal of Bioethical Inquiry is a quarterly peer-reviewed academic journal covering bioethics that was established in 2004. It is published by Springer Science+Business Media and the editors-in-chief are Michael A. Ashby (University of Tasmania) and Bronwen Morrell (University of Sydney).

== Abstracting and indexing ==
The journal is abstracted and indexed in:

- CINAHL
- EBSCO databases
- Index Medicus/MEDLINE/PubMed
- ProQuest databases
- PsycINFO
- Science Citation Index Expanded
- Scopus
- Social Sciences Citation Index
- The Philosopher's Index

According to the Journal Citation Reports, the journal has a 2019 impact factor of 1.425.
