= Bioethics (journal) =

- Discipline: Bioethics, philosophy
- Language: English
- Edited by: Ruth Chadwick; Udo Schüklenk

Publication details
- History: 1987–present
- Publisher: John Wiley & Sons
- Frequency: Monthly
- Impact factor: 1.66 (2018)

Standard abbreviations
- ISO 4: Bioethics

Indexing
- ISSN: 0269-9702 (print); 1467-8519 (web)
- LCCN: 90649301
- OCLC no.: 15622366
- Developing World Bioethics
- ISSN: 1471-8731 (print); 1471-8847 (web)

Links
- Journal homepage; Online access; Online archive

Bioethics is a monthly peer-reviewed academic journal published by Wiley-Blackwell in association with the International Association of Bioethics. The editors-in-chief are Ruth Chadwick (Cardiff University) and Udo Schüklenk (Queen's University). In 2011 Bioethics celebrated 25 years of publication with a conference and a special issue of the journal.

== Abstracting and indexing ==
The journal is abstracted and indexed in MEDLINE, PubMed the Arts and Humanities Citation Index, Applied Social Sciences Index and Abstracts, Worldwide Political Science Abstracts, CINAHL, Current Contents/Social & Behavioral Sciences, Excerpta Medica, Philosopher's Index, PsycINFO, Science Citation Index Expanded, Social Sciences Citation Index, and Psychological Abstracts.

According to the Journal Citation Reports, the journal has a 2018 impact factor of 1.66, ranking it 10/52 of journals in the category "Ethics", 4/16 of journals in the category "Medical Ethics", 15/40 of journals in the category "Social Issues", and 18/42 of journals in the category "Social Sciences Biomedical".

== Developing World Bioethics ==
In 2001 a companion journal was established named Developing World Bioethics and both journals can only be obtained in a combined subscription.

== See also ==
- List of ethics journals
