= European Journal of Health Law =

- Discipline: Law
- Language: English

Publication details
- History: 1994–present
- Publisher: Brill Publishers
- Frequency: 5/year
- Open access: Hybrid

Standard abbreviations
- ISO 4: Eur. J. Health Law

Indexing
- ISSN: 0929-0273 (print); 1571-8093 (web)

Links
- Journal homepage

The European Journal of Health Law is a peer-reviewed academic journal published by Brill Nijhoff. It was first published in 1994, replacing a journal entitled Medicine and Law to reflect a move away from focusing only on clinical negligence litigation. The journal publishes scholarly articles, notes, reports, and book reviews. It is the official journal of the European Association of Health Law. The editor-in-chief is Herman Nys (KU Leuven).
