= Érudit =

Quebec publishing platform

Logo of Érudit

Érudit (French: [eʁydi]) is a Quebec-based non-profit publishing platform. Founded in 1998, it is the largest provider of Canadian French and bilingual research publications in the humanities and social sciences, as well as select physical and natural science journals. The organization is a consortium of Université de Montréal, Université Laval, and Université du Québec à Montréal. Over 95% of the content on Érudit is offered in open access; for some journals, the most recent two or three years of issues are restricted, and by subscription only.

== Partnership for Open Access ==
The Partnership for Open Access (POA) is a joint project by Érudit and the Canadian Research Knowledge Network (CRKN) that aims to ensure financial support for non-commercial scientific journals through the engagement of more than 90 partner university libraries. It is also a pillar of Coalition Publica, the partnership between Érudit and the Public Knowledge Project (PKP) that aims to advance research dissemination and digital scholarly publishing in Canada.

The Partnership for Open Access is part of the diamond open access movement, a model of collective funding that ensures there is no cost to read nor to publish research articles. In 2024, the Partnership for Open Access was recognized by the Quebec Network for Social Innovation (RQIS), who noted that the project “promotes universal access—free from financial or geographic barriers—to research findings in the humanities and social sciences.”
