= St. George's University =

University in Grenada, West Indies

- Motto: Think Beyond
- Type: Private, Medical School
- Established: July 23, 1976
- Parent institution: Medforth Global Healthcare Education
- Chancellor: Charles R. Modica
- Location: St. George's, St. George, Grenada; 12.00000°N 61.77375°W
- Campus: 42 acres (17 ha); True Blue Bay
- Colors: SGU Red and Black
- Mascot: Knights
- Website: sgu.edu

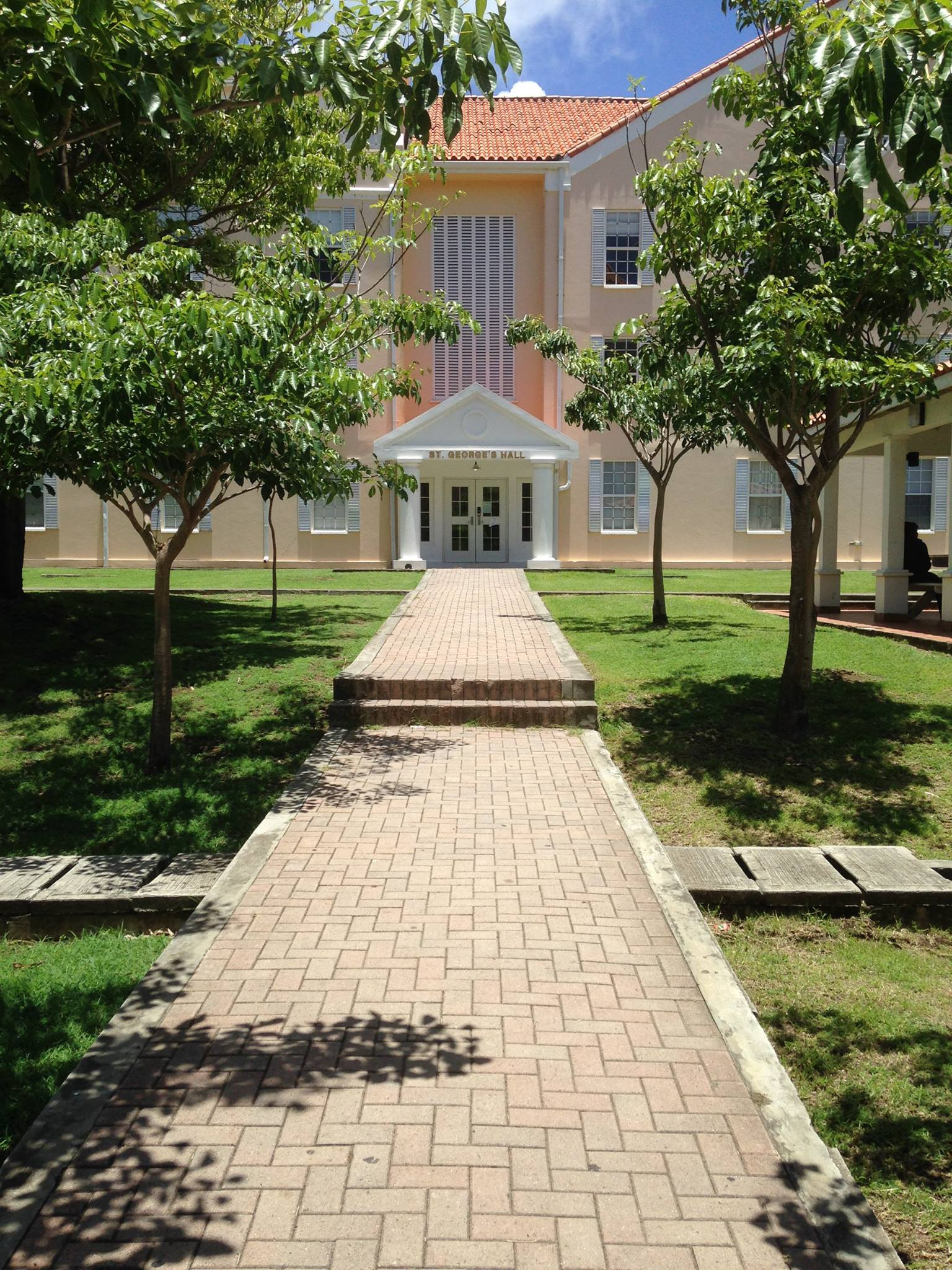
St. George's Hall, one of the residence halls.

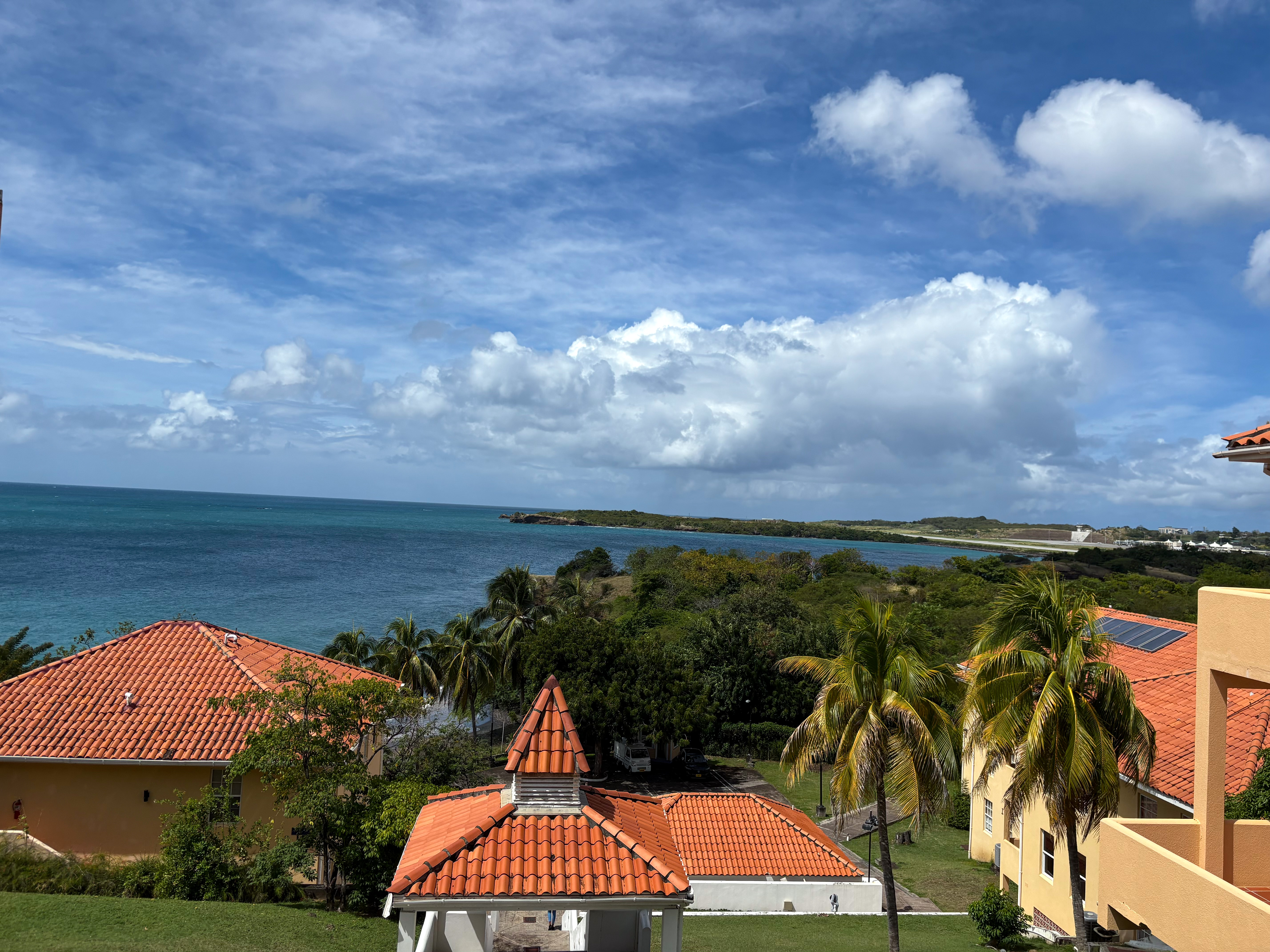
View from The Bourne Center, one of the study spots around campus.

St. George's University is a private for-profit medical school and international university in Grenada, West Indies, offering degrees in medicine, veterinary medicine, public health, the health sciences, nursing, arts and sciences, and business. St. George's University was established by an act of Grenada's parliament on July 23, 1976. Classes in the School of Medicine began January 17, 1977. In 1993, the university added graduate and undergraduate programs. In 1996, it was granted a charter for the School of Arts and Sciences and a Graduate Studies Program. In 1997, undergraduate courses in international business, life sciences, medical sciences, pre-medical and pre-veterinary medicine were added. The School of Veterinary Medicine was established in 1999, as was the university's Department of Public Health and Preventive Medicine.

== History ==
St. George's University was founded on July 23, 1976, by an act of Grenada's Parliament, which was then effectively controlled by Prime Minister Eric M. Gairy. The school was named for the capital city of Grenada, but it was the brainchild of Charles R. Modica, a 29-year-old lawyer and education entrepreneur. Modica envisioned creating a for-profit medical school in the English-speaking Caribbean that would cater to academically qualified American students who failed to gain admission to medical schools in the United States. Besides Modica, the other three original founders of the school were also from Long Island: Louis J. Modica, Charles' father and a successful real estate developer; Edward McGowan, also a land developer; and Patrick F. Adams, a business lawyer. The university's corporate structure is currently held within Medforth Global Healthcare Education, which also operates the Rocky Vista University College of Osteopathic Medicine in Parker, Colorado and in Ivins, Utah.

Classes at St. George's School of Medicine began on January 17, 1977, with 125 students and six part-faculty. Almost all of the founding faculty members had been educated either in the United States or Europe. By the early 1979, the school had expanded to 23 full-time faculty and about 600 island-resident students.

On March 13, 1979, a Marxist-inspired revolutionary party forcibly overturned Gairy's rule. Despite the school's association with the ousted Gairy regime, it survived and prospered under the new prime minister, Maurice Bishop, because it generated significant income for the government and people of Grenada. The school amicably co-existed with the revolutionary regime until Bishop also became embroiled in a domestic leadership challenge four years later.

On October 19, 1983, Bishop and seven of his closest supporters were executed by Army soldiers loyal to an insurgent element in Bishop's own party. To quell any mass protests, the island's military declared martial law and placed the entire island under a 24-hour, shoot-on-sight curfew. The repression raised fears in the Eastern Caribbean that Grenada's turmoil would destabilize democracy and law and order in the entire region. In Washington, the Reagan Administration feared for the safety of 1,000 US citizens on the island (including students, faculty, families, etc.). The U.S. government, urged on by allies in the English-speaking Caribbean, launched Operation Urgent Fury on Oct. 25, 1983. The surprise invasion was an attempt to secure the safety of American nationals on the island, but also sought to restore Westminster-style democracy and evict the Soviet-Cuban presence on Grenada because the U.S government did not trust Grenadians to make their own leadership decisions.

The operation was supposed to have been essentially over in a day, but the invading multi-national forces ran into stiffer than expected resistance from the Grenada's People's Revolutionary Army and militarized Cuban workers on the island. On D-Day, the principal independent information coming out of the island was from a ham radio operated by a St. George's student.

Because of an intelligence failure, the American-led forces landed on the island without knowing that the medical school had more than one campus. It took the invaders three days to reach all the students and staff on the island. Eventually 564 were evacuated back to U.S. soil without suffering any injuries.

In his memoirs, President Reagan recounted the return to the U.S. of the St. George's students as an event that affected him deeply. "I was among many in our country whose eyes got a little misty when I watched their arrival in the United States on television and saw some of them lean down and kiss U.S. soil the moment that they stepped off the airplanes that brought them home."

Charles R. Modica, the school's founder and chancellor, initially criticized the invasion as "very unnecessary," but changed his mind the next day after receiving a private State Department briefing that convinced him the intervention was justified. Classes were moved to Long Island, New York; New Jersey, and Barbados temporarily until 1984.

In response to Hurricane Ivan in 2004, students were again relocated temporarily to campuses in the United States. The school has a comprehensive hurricane plan in place currently.

In August 2014, SGU received a $750 million investment from Baring Private Equity Asia and Altas Partners, a Canadian private equity company whose other major investment is in a salt mining operation. In August 2015, G. Richard Olds, the founder and past dean of UC Riverside School of Medicine, was named as the school's president and CEO. Dr. Andrew Sussman, former executive vice president of clinical services for CVS Health, was appointed the university's CEO in May 2017.

== Campus ==
St. George's University owns 65 buildings on 42 acres of land, spread out in a peninsula in the southwest corner of Grenada located in the West Indies. A major campus expansion begun in the early 1990s resulted in 52 new buildings. The architecture of the buildings are of Georgian architecture.

The campus was built to withstand severe weather and houses its own generators and desalination plants. These resources helped serve the island community during the hurricane of 2004. This storm has been the only recorded hurricane to hit Grenada, however the school continues to prepare the campus for severe weather. However, in 2024 a category 5 hurricane, named hurricane Beryl hit the island. Luckily due to the good craftmanship of the school minimal damage was noted. The school only needed to pause operations for 48 hours.

The school also has independent water tanks, desalination centers, and generators. This make the school completely prepared in any situation.

== Academics ==
=== School of Medicine ===
St. George's University School of Medicine offers a Doctor of Medicine degree program that can be earned individually or as part of a dual degree with a Master of Public Health, Master of Business Administration, Master of Science, or Bachelor of Science. The School of Medicine is accredited by the Grenada Medical and Dental Council (GMDC). GMDC has been recognized by the World Federation of Medical Education (WFME) and the U.S. National Committee on Foreign Medical Education and Accreditation (NCFMEA), a panel of experts organized by the U.S. Department of Education, which determined that GMDC uses standards that are comparable to the standards used to accredit medical schools in the United States.

=== School of Veterinary Medicine ===
St. George's University School of Veterinary Medicine (SGUSVM) was started in 1999, with the first faculty member Dr. Sunil Gupta, a veterinarian and anatomist, being tasked with forming a veterinary school. The School of Veterinary Medicine received accreditation from the American Veterinary Medical Association Council on Education (AVMA COE) in 2011 and was reaccredited in 2018. Accreditation is reviewed every seven years and is scheduled to be evaluated in 2025. Additionally, in 2019 the school obtained accreditation by the Royal College of Veterinary Surgeons (RCVS) making it one of few schools to be accredited by both the AVMA and RCVS. St. George's University's Small Animal Clinic (SAC) received accreditation from the American Animal Hospital Association (AAHA) in 2016.

=== School of Graduate Studies ===
St. George's University School of Graduate Studies (SGUSGS) is composed of 100+ faculty members and 300+ post-graduate students studying in excess of 200+ fields of research. The campus is also home to the Windward Islands Research and Education Foundation (WINDREF), a non-profit organization that is focused on "the promotion of health, well-being, and sustainable development through multi-disciplinary research, education, and community programs".

=== School of Arts and Sciences ===
St. George's School of Arts and Sciences (SGUSAS) was started in 1996 and currently offers degrees in accounting, arts, biological sciences, business, chemistry, computer science, economics, English, marine sciences, mathematics, music, physics, and psychology.

As of 2022, the School of Arts and Sciences also houses the university's Honor's college, which consists of the Royal Society of Biology (RSB) accredited honor's Bachelor of Science degree (BSc Hons) in Marine, Wildlife and Conservation Biology.

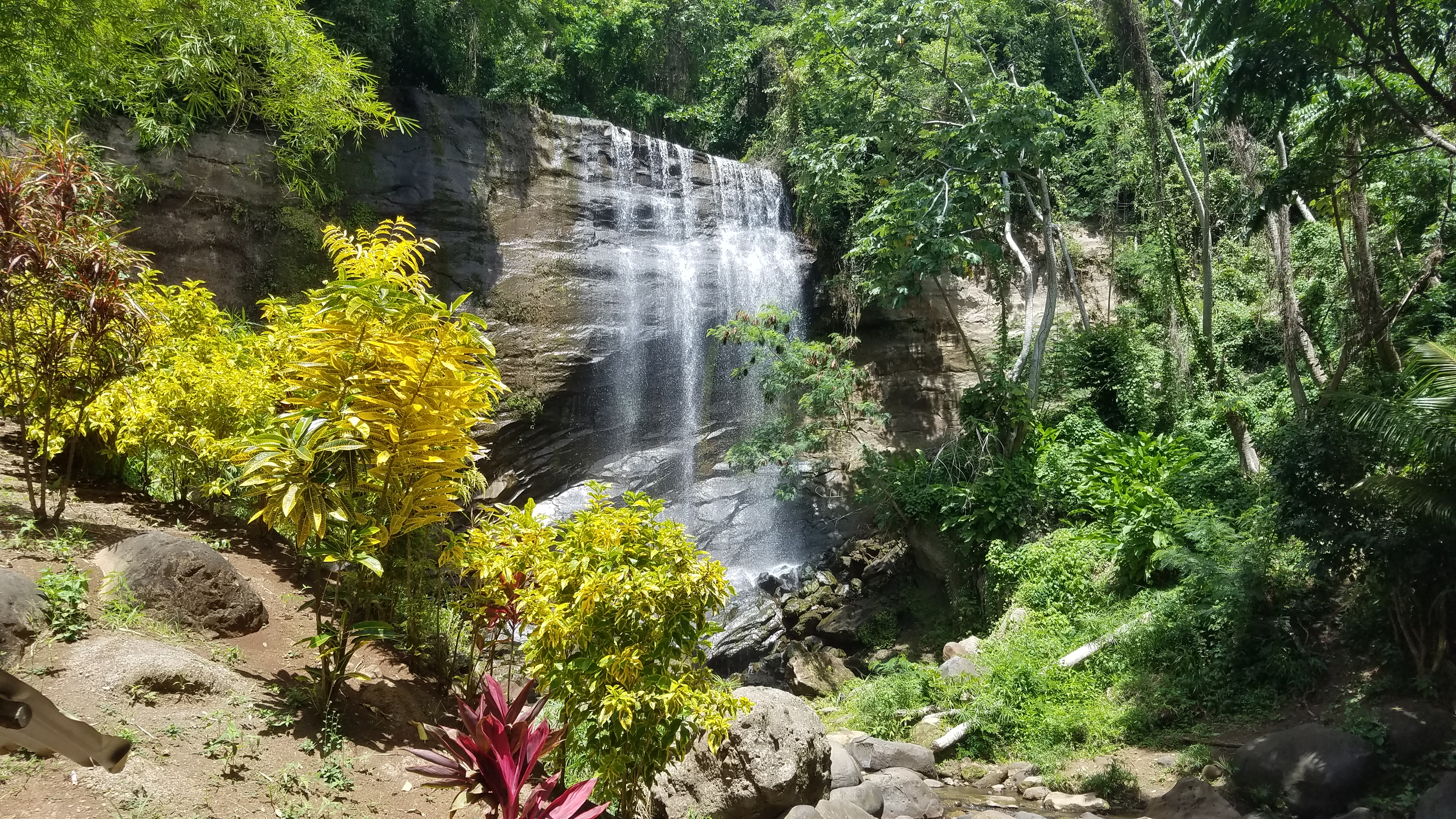
Mt. Carmel waterfall located in the St. Andrew Parish of Grenada

== University administration ==
Chancellors

- Charles R. Modica (1976–present)

Presidents

- Charles R. Modica (1976–2015)
- G. Richard Olds (2015–present)

Vice Chancellors

- Geoffrey H. Bourne, anatomist/primatologist (1978–1988)
- Keith B. Taylor, gastroenterologist (1989–1998)
- Peter Bourne, physician (1999–2003)
- Richard Liebowitz, internist (2018–present)

== Notable alumni ==
- Rosalind Ambrose, founding member of the Caribbean Society of Radiologists
- Suzanne Mallouk, Canadian-born painter, psychiatrist, best known for her relationship with artist Jean-Michel Basquiat
- Roxana Mehran, cardiologist and the Mount Sinai Endowed Professor of Medicine at the Icahn School of Medicine at Mount Sinai
- Matthew Memoli, acting director, National Institutes of Health
- Robert Lewis Morgan, politician who served in the New Jersey General Assembly for one term from 2004 to 2006

== Notable faculty ==
- Peter Bourne, physician
- Mary Jeanne Kreek, neuroscientist – visiting professor, neurobiology, 1979-2015
- George McGuire, former educator
- Stephen S. Morse, epidemiologist, influenza researcher, specialist on emerging infectious diseases – senior research fellow, Windward Islands Research and Education Foundation, SGU
- Robert R. Redfield, former director of the Centers for Disease Control and Prevention – visiting professor, pathophysiology

== Notable speakers ==
White Coat Ceremony Speakers
School of Medicine

- Ben Carson, neurosurgeon, 2016 US presidential candidate (August 1996)
- Jonathan Mann, former director of the Global Programme on AIDS (now UNAIDS) (January 1998)
- Donald Hopkins, Director of Health Programs, The Carter Center (August 2000)
- Mark Siegler, director, MacLean Center for Clinical Medical Ethics (January 2001)
- Arnold P. Gold, founder and president, Gold Humanism Honor Society (January 2005)
- Ezekiel Emanuel, chair, Department of Clinical Bioethics, Warren G. Magnuson Clinical Center, National Institutes of Health (January 2006)
- Sir Kenneth Calman, Chief Medical Officer of Scotland (August 2009)
- Lord Walton of Detchant (August 2010)
- Charles Twort, physician, Guy's and St Thomas' NHS Foundation Trust (January 2013)

Bourne Lecture Speakers

- Anthony S. Fauci, head, National Institute of Allergy and Infectious Diseases (NIAID) (1998)
- William Foege, director, Centers for Disease Control and Prevention (CDC) (2001)
- Lord Soulsby of Swaffham Prior, microbiologist/parasitologist (2002)
- Sir Graeme Robertson Dawson Catto, president, General Medical Council, United Kingdom (2003)

Keith B. Taylor Memorial/WINDREF Lecture Speakers

- Lord Walton of Detchant (2002)
- Lord Soulsby of Swaffham Prior, microbiologist/parasitologist (2004)
- Valentín Fuster, cardiologist and past president, American Heart Association (AHA) (2010)
- Baron Peter Piot, co-discoverer, Ebola virus disease; former director of the Global Programme on AIDS (now UNAIDS) (2012)
- Robert Gallo, director/co-founder, Institute of Human Virology (IHV); co-discoverer of HIV (2013)

== See also ==
- List of medical schools in the Caribbean
- International medical graduate
