= Sonali Smith =

American oncologist

- Born: Chicago, Illinois, USA
- Spouse: Norm Smith

Academic background
- Education: MD, Feinberg School of Medicine

Academic work
- Institutions: University of Chicago

Sonali Mehta Smith is an American oncologist. She is the Elwood V. Jensen Professor and Chief of the Hematology/Oncology Section at the University of Chicago.

== Early life and education ==
Smith was born in Chicago, Illinois, to first-generation Indian immigrant parents. Her mother was a pediatrician and allergist and her father was an engineer who also owned a nursing home. She completed her medical degree at Feinberg School of Medicine, where she remained for her medical residency, before enrolling at the University of Chicago for her medical fellowship. When asked what drew her to the institution Smith said: "One of the reasons I went to the University of Chicago was that it has a very strong research program, and I wanted to explore the immune system’s ability to turn its T cells and B cells against itself in the form of lymphoma."

== Career ==
Upon completing her hematology/oncology fellowship, Smith was appointed to the faculty of the Hematology/Oncology Section at the University of Chicago in 2001. In 2011, she was appointed Director of the Lymphoma Program and served as co-leader of the Cancer Service Line. While serving in these roles, she was also Vice-Chair of the Southwest Oncology Group Lymphoma Committee, where she oversaw clinical trial development, and as chair of the Career Development and Engagement Subcommittee for the American Society of Oncology. Smith also sat on various editorial boards including Hematology and Journal of Cancer Research and Clinical Oncology. She was recognized for her educational contributions with election to the Pritzker School of Medicine's Academy of Distinguished Medical Educators and as a Senior Faculty Scholar in the Bucksbaum Institute for Clinical Excellence. She was subsequently promoted to the rank of Full professor and named the Elwood V. Jensen Professor of Medicine in 2017.

In January 2021, Smith became the first woman to hold the position of Section Chief of Hematology/Oncology at UChicago Medicine. She was also listed by Chicago magazine for being at the forefront in her field.

== Personal life ==
Smith and her husband Norm Smith have four children together.
