= MacLean Center for Clinical Medical Ethics =

American clinical medical ethics research institute

- Founded: 1981
- Type: Clinical medical ethics research and training institute
- Headquarters: University of Chicago
- Location: Chicago, Illinois, United States
- Director: Mark Siegler
- Key people: Peter Angelos; Marshall Chin; Lainie Friedman Ross; Daniel Sulmasy

The MacLean Center for Clinical Medical Ethics, founded in 1981, is a non-profit clinical medical ethics research institute based in the United States. Founded by its director, Mark Siegler, the MacLean Center for Clinical Medical Ethics aims to improve patient care and outcomes by promoting research in clinical medical ethics by educating physicians, nurses, and other health care professionals and by helping University of Chicago Medicine patients, families, and health care providers identify and resolve ethical dilemmas. The center has trained over 410 fellows, including many physicians, attorneys, PhDs and bioethicists.

== History ==
In 1983, with support from Dorothy J. MacLean and the MacLean family, the University of Chicago established the nation's first program devoted to clinical medical ethics. Dr. Mark Siegler was appointed its founding director. The MacLean Center for Clinical Medical Ethics was pivotal in establishing and expanding the field of clinical medical ethics. It did this through its pioneering program in ethics fellowship training; its foundational role in ethics consultation; its close involvement in research and the protection of human subjects through an innovative concept of "research ethics consultation;" and by encouraging scholarly research and publication in clinical medical ethics. The center also encouraged the "empirical turn" in bioethics scholarship, an approach that uses clinical epidemiology, health services research, and decision science techniques to study ethical matters in clinical practice. The center's current and former faculty and fellows have published more than 210 books on topics related to medicine and medical ethics.

== Fellowship ==
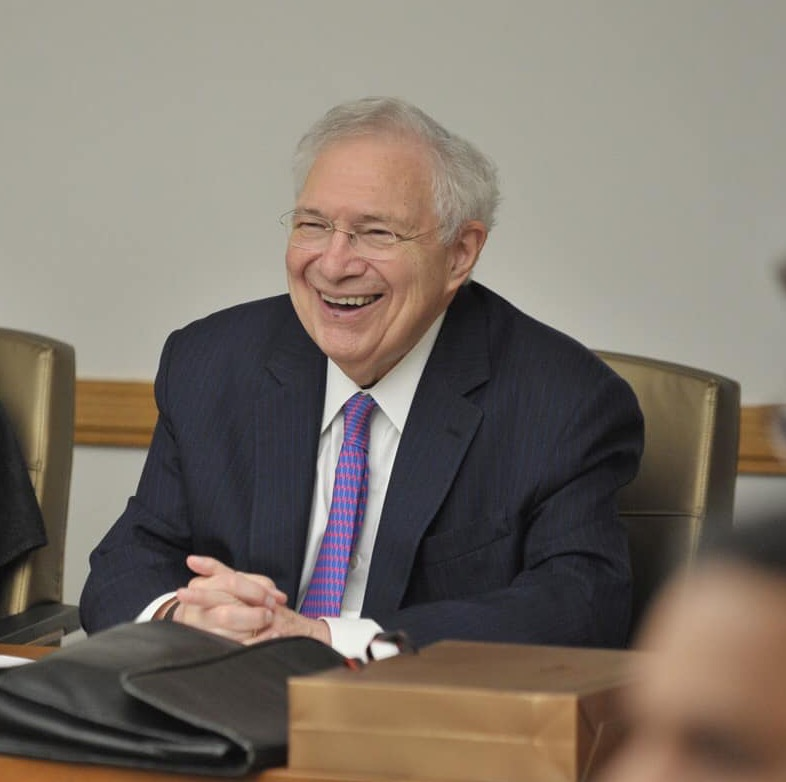
Mark Siegler at the MacLean Center for Clinical Medical Ethics

The MacLean for Clinical Medical Ethics at the University of Chicago offers the oldest, largest, and most successful clinical ethics fellowship in the world. Dr. Mark Siegler, the Founding Director of the MacLean Center, created the first clinical ethics fellowship in the nation in 1981. Since then, the MacLean Center faculty members have trained more than 320 fellows, many of whom have gone on to direct their own ethics programs. While most fellows are physicians, the center welcomes those interested in medical ethics from any perspective, including philosophy, theology, nursing, law, and the social sciences. The MacLean Center, with more than 45 faculty members from many disciplines, provides training in clinical medical ethics and specialized fellowships in surgical ethics and pediatric ethics. Prior to 2014, through a partnership with the United States Veterans Administration (VA) hospital system, two or three VA medical professionals per year are selected by the VA through a national search to participate in the MacLean Center ethics fellowship training program.

== Consultation ==
Since 1981, The MacLean Center has offered clinical ethics consultations to assist patients, families, physicians, nurses, and students. MacLean Center fellows and faculty wrote many of the early papers guiding the field of clinical ethics consultation. The Center developed the concept of "research ethics consultation" in 1987 and has continued to offer this service to translational researchers and to the IRB.

== Research ==
MacLean Center research has been on the cutting edge of both medicine and ethics, with clinical research proceeding in tandem with medical advances. The MacLean Center was involved in the introduction of pediatric live-donor liver transplantation in 1989. This new procedure raised complex ethical questions about medical innovation, risk/benefit balancing, informed consent, and the protection of "living organ donors". The MacLean Center worked for two years with transplant experts at the University of Chicago to review the ethical issues, publish protocols, and encourage professional discussion of the procedure before it was first performed on a patient. The MacLean Center's transplant work is one example of the wide range of ethics-related research projects undertaken by its faculty. The MacLean Center faculty publishes on subjects such as research ethics, health policy, health disparities, end of life care, surgical ethics, pediatric outcomes, genetics, and transplantation ethics. Current and former MacLean Center faculty and fellows have published more than 150 books in the field of medical ethics.

== Events ==
For over 30 years, the MacLean Center has directed and sponsored programs form faculty and students at the University of Chicago. Since 1984, The Interdisciplinary Faculty Seminar Series has organized weekly meetings throughout the academic year to provide a sustainable interdisciplinary forum on issues in medicine and medical ethics. Additionally, every November, the MacLean Center hosts the Dorothy J. MacLean Fellows Conference, which draws speakers and audiences from a wide range of disciplines.

=== Interdisciplinary Faculty Seminar Series ===
In 1981, under the auspices of the MacLean Center, Mark Siegler and Richard Epstein organized a yearlong interdisciplinary seminar series on Bad Outcomes after Medical Intervention. The success of that initial seminar program demonstrated that there was great interest at the University of Chicago in creating a sustainable interdisciplinary forum to discuss health-related subjects with colleagues from across campus. Since 1981, the MacLean Center has sponsored an annual seminar series that has examined the ethical aspects of one key health related issue each year. Previous topics have included: Organ Transplantation, Pediatric Ethics, End-of-Life Care, Global Health, Health Care Disparities, Medical Professionalism, Confidentiality, and Pharmaceutical Innovation and Regulation.

=== Annual Dorothy J. MacLean Fellows Conference ===
Each year for the past 28 years, the MacLean Center has hosted a conference that draws speakers, primarily former fellows of the MacLean Center, who discuss today's issues in clinical medical ethics. The conference audience usually numbers 250 to 300 and includes more than 100 former faculty and fellows. The conference remembers Dorothy Jean MacLean, who helped create the MacLean Center and was deeply committed to its work. D.J. MacLean believed that education was the best way to improve the world and throughout her life supported many leading educational institutions.

The 28th consecutive MacLean Fellows Conference will be held on November 11–12, 2016. More than 35 former fellows will be giving presentations.

== Resources ==
=== Library ===
The MacLean Center Library, started by generous donations from Drs. Edmund Pellegrino, Leon Kass, and James J. Smith, as well as by Dr. Sulmasy and Dr. Siegler, exists as a non-lending resource for faculty, fellows, and students working in the field of clinical medical ethics. The library currently houses an interdisciplinary collection of over five-thousand books and visual media. The library subscribes to twenty-five journals related to medicine and ethics, and presently maintains complete collections from Volume 1 of many of the core journals in medical ethics including the "Hastings Center Report", Journal of Clinical Ethics, "Cambridge Quarterly of Healthcare Ethics", "Kennedy Institute of Ethics Journal", "Journal of Medicine and Philosophy", ""National Catholic Bioethics Quarterly"", and "Theoretical Medicine and Bioethics". The library recently received an additional donation of over 1,300 books from the personal libraries of Drs. Edmund Pellegrino and Professor Alan J. Wiesbard. The library is currently working to digitize and catalog its collection of over 400 videos related to medical ethics that date back to the 1980. Library staff anticipates making this collection available to faculty and students online by the end of the 2014 academic year integrating its catalogue with the University of Chicago central catalogue.

== Awards and honors ==
=== Cornerstone Award ===
The MacLean Center received the Cornerstone Award on October 25, 2013 from the American Society for Bioethics and Humanities for "outstanding contributions from an institution that has helped shape the direction of the fields of bioethics and/or medical humanities." The MacLean Center joined the three other institutions that have received this award in the past: the Hastings Center, the Kennedy Institute of Ethics, and the Institute for Medical Humanities at Galveston, Texas.

=== The MacLean Center Prize ===
The MacLean Center Prize in Clinical Ethics and Health Outcomes celebrates individuals who have made transformative contributions to the field of clinical ethics through scholarship, practice, leadership, and policy development. The MacLean Center Prize of $50,000 is the largest prize in Clinical Ethics. The first recipient of the MacLean Center Prize was Dr. John Wennberg, the Peggy Y. Thomson Professor Emeritus for the Evaluative Clinical Sciences at Dartmouth Medical School. The most recent recipient of the MacLean Center Prize, recognized in November 2012, is " Dr. Peter Singer ". A former MacLean Center Fellow, Dr. Singer has dedicated much of his career to the ethics of global health.
