= Lainie Friedman Ross =

American physician and bioethicist

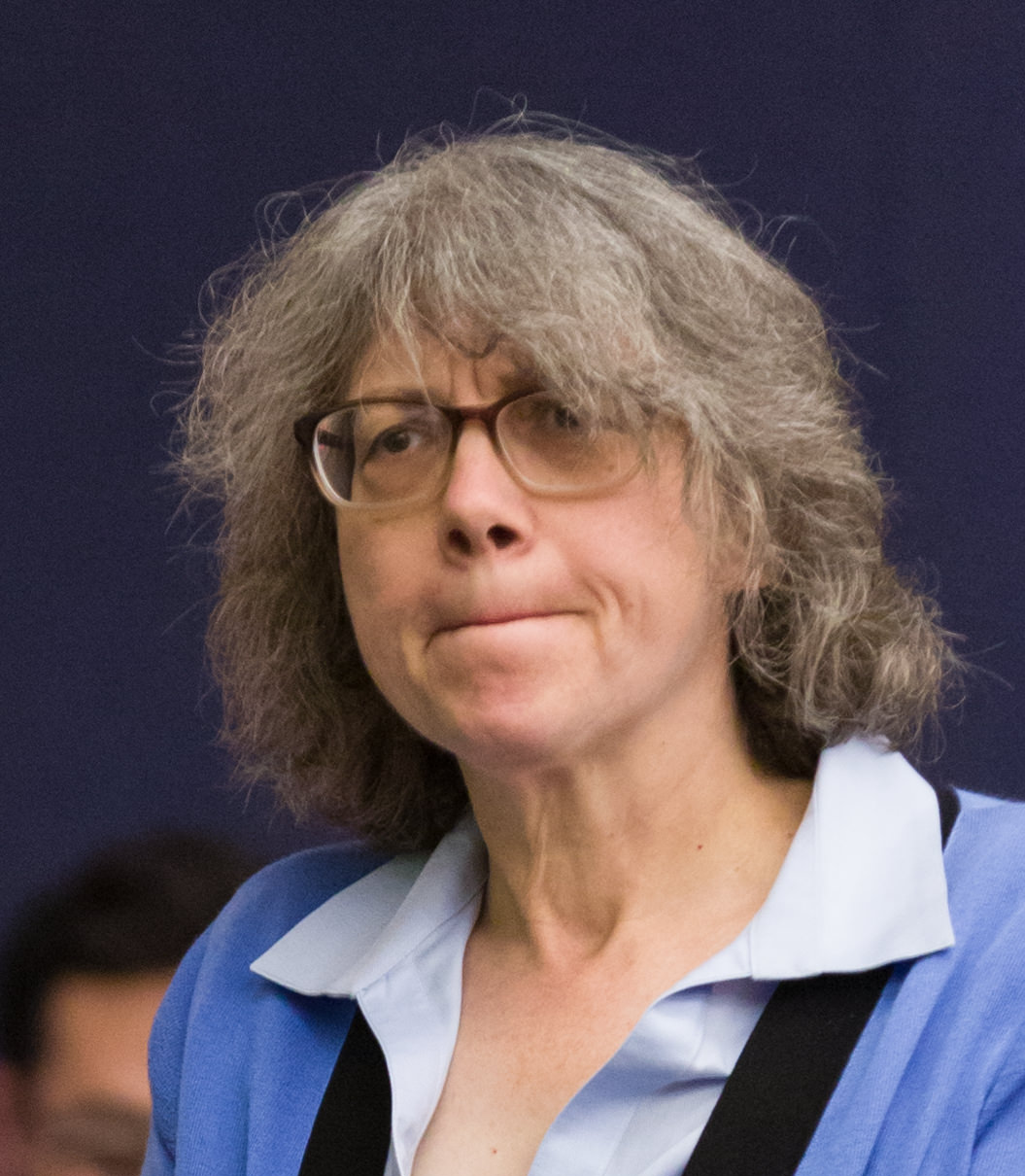
Ross in 2018

Lainie Friedman Ross is an American physician and bioethicist who works at the University of Rochester as Dean's Professor and inaugural Chair, Department of Health Humanities and Bioethics.

== Early life ==
Lainie Friedman Ross is a 1982 graduate of Princeton University where she graduated from the Woodrow Wilson School of Public and International Affairs. She has a medical degree from the University of Pennsylvania, and she also obtained an M.Phil and a PhD in philosophy from Yale University.

== Career ==
Currently she is a fellow of the American Academy of Pediatrics where she serves on various committees. She also serves as a member of the United Network for Organ Sharing and National Institutes of Health and have over 60 peer-reviewed articles. Besides articles she also published two books called Children, Families and Health Care Decision Making and Children in Medical Research: Access Versus Protection both of which were published by Oxford University Press in 1998 and 2006 respectively. Aside from being an author, she is also an editor of various peer-reviewed journals including Theoretical Medicine and Bioethics, the Journal of Clinical Ethics and Perspectives in Biology and Medicine among others.

Ross is the Carolyn and Matthew Bucksbaum Professor of Clinical Medical Ethics; Professor, Departments of Pediatrics, Medicine, Surgery and the College; and Associate Director of the MacLean Center for Clinical Medical Ethics. Ross has published two books on pediatric ethics: Children, Families and Health Care Decision Making (Oxford University Press, 1998) and Children in Medical Research: Access versus Protection (Oxford University Press, 2006) and has co-authored two books with Robert M. Veatch (Transplantation Ethics, 2nd edition, Georgetown University Press, 2015; and Defining Death: The Case for Choice, Georgetown University Press, 2016). Ross has also published over 100 articles in peer-reviewed journals in the areas of pediatric ethics, transplantation ethics, research ethics and genetics and ethics. Ross was a 2014 recipient of a John Simon Guggenheim Memorial Foundation Fellowship and the 2015 recipient of the William Bartholome Award in Ethical Excellence from the American Academy of Pediatrics. She currently serve on the National Institutes of Health Recombinant DNA Advisory Committee (RAC), the National Institutes of Health study section of Societal and Ethical Issues in Research (SEIR), and a National Academies of Sciences, Engineering, and Medicine's Committee on Issues in Organ Donor Intervention Research. She proposed the Constrained Parental Autonomy model for surrogate decision making in pediatrics.
