= Grenada National Museum =

Historic building in St George's, Grenada

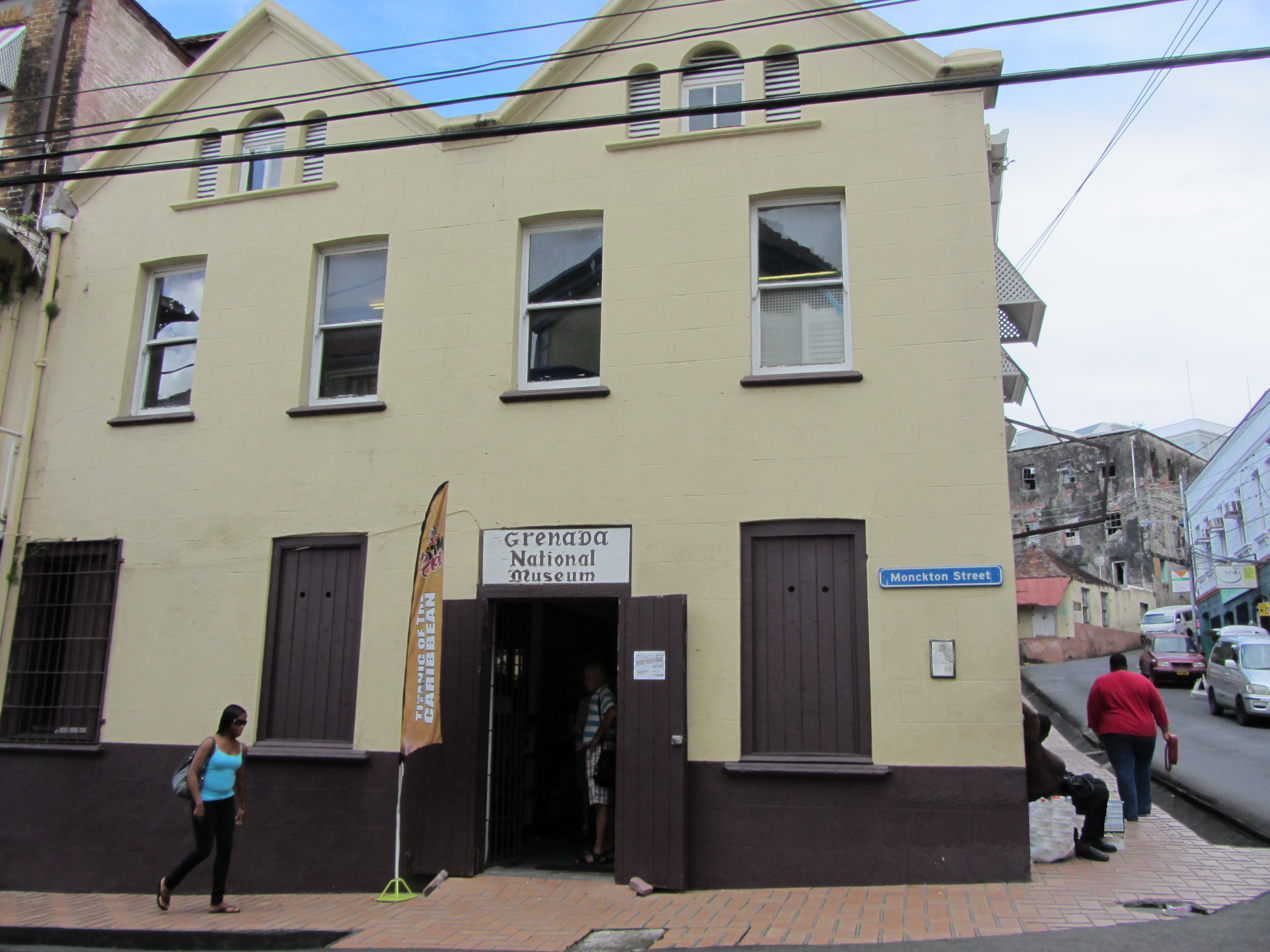

- Grenada National Museum
- Established: 1976
- Location: Monckton Street, St. George's, Grenada
- Coordinates: 12.050576°N 61.752655°W
- Type: Amerindian, African, and European History in Grenada
- Website: museum.gd

The Grenada National Museum is a museum in St. George's, Grenada. It is housed in a complex of several buildings, the oldest of which may have served as a French barracks from 1704. Parts of it were used by the adjacent prison until the 1850s, when the land was sold and the Home Hotel was built. It remained a hotel (and briefly, a warehouse in the 1940s) under several owners until closing in the early 1960s. In 1976, the Gairy government donated part of the complex for use as a museum of archaeology and history. Topics on display include Amerindians/Precolonial, the European Invasion, African Slavery, Plantation Economy, the former whaling industry, and colonial-era equipment and artifacts, including several items and a bathtub purportedly used by Josephine Bonaparte.

== History ==
The museum is housed in a building located at the corner of Young and Monckton streets. It served as a military barracks for the French army in 1704. It then became the island's first hotel. Two other different hotels under different owners followed, and at one point was used as a warehouse by a merchant working in St. George's..

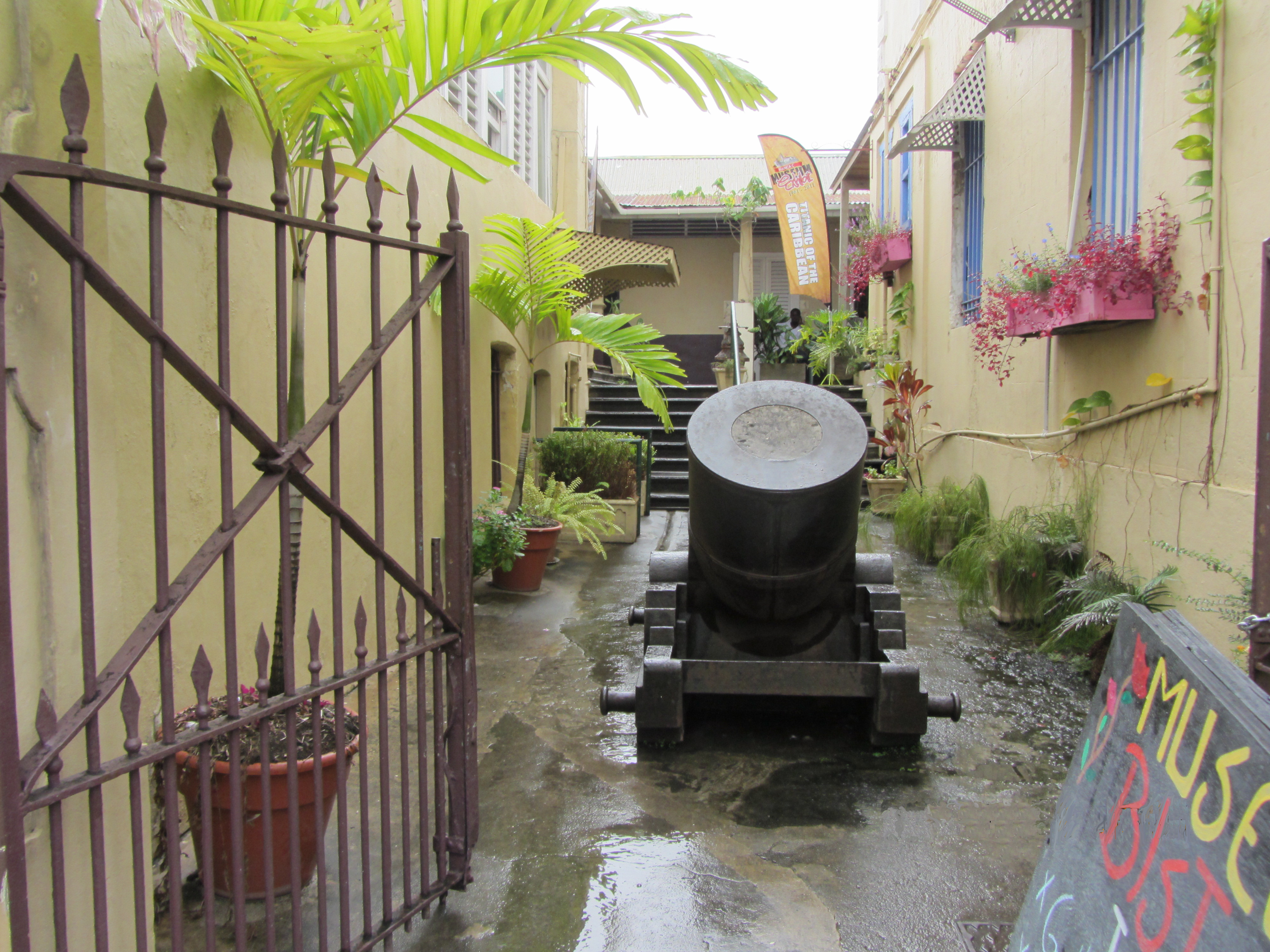
Grenada National Museum

The museum was established in 1976 by private citizens who organized as the country's historical society. The theme is archaeology and history. With donations received from the Republic Bank, the museum is slated to improve the quality of exhibits related to Amerindian culture and history and of the European takeover.

== Collections and displays ==
The GNM has been closed since the COVID-19 pandemic. Prior exhibits included "Slavery, First Inhabitants, Plantation Economy, Whaling & Fishing Archaeology, and Early Transport & Technology". The native Grenadian culture is well represented. The exhibits in the museum cover history from the Ciboneys (native Indian culture of Grenada) to the colonial period.

Displays consist of remnants of pottery finds of the Amerindians, an ancient rum still, and the marble bathtub used by Empress Josephine when she was a child. There are exhibits of events related to the assassination of Maurice Bishop and the war that resulted as a result of storming of Grenada by the US. Apart from cultural history the exhibits also cover political events till the 1980s. Though small, there are exhibits of antiquaries from the archaeological excavations, including ceramics, plus petroglyphs of native fauna, and the first telegraph line installed in the city in 1871. Also of note are Kalinago, Yoruba, and Arawak artifacts, sugar processing machines and equipment, and whaling industry items. Proclamations, photos, and news items chronicle events such as the Invasion of Grenada. Exhibits are also provided by children from local schools.

== Education ==
An education programme under the title "The Grenada National Museum Press" (GNMP) has been established to provide information to the visitors on the history of the Caribs Island, the thwarted attempt of the British in 1609 to settle on the island, and the period of French occupation. The Grenada Historical Society is also located within the museum. Educational books, maps, and pamphlets are available, as well as educator resources to accommodate group visits to the museum.
