= Marshall Chin =

American physician

- Born: Concord, Massachusetts
- Education: BA, History and Science, 1985, MPH, 1994, Harvard University; MD, 1989, University of California, San Francisco
- Spouse: Naoko Muramatsu
- Scientific career
- Fields: Medicine, medical ethics
- Institutions: University of Chicago
- Thesis: The development of research in the Massachusetts cancer program, 1926-40 (1985)

Marshall Howard Chin is an American physician. He is the Richard Parrillo Family Professor of Healthcare Ethics at the University of Chicago and the Associate Director of the MacLean Center for Clinical Medical Ethics. Chin's major research focus is on improving shared decision making among health professionals and LGBTQ racial/ethnic minority patients. He has led investigations on health disparities in diabetes care in health centers serving vulnerable populations with limited assets.

== Early life and education ==
Chin was born and raised in Concord, Massachusetts by second-generation Chinese-American parents. He received his BA from Harvard College in 1985 and his medical degree from UCSF School of Medicine in 1989. As part of his Harvard degree, Chin published an undergraduate thesis entitled "The development of research in the Massachusetts cancer program, 1926-40." After receiving his medical degree, Chin completed his residency in internal medicine at Brigham and Women's Hospital and his fellowship in internal medicine at Harvard Medical School. While completing his fellowship, Chin also earned a Master's degree in public health (MPH) at Harvard in 1994.

== Career ==
Upon completing his MPH and fellowship, Chin joined the Department of Medicine at the University of Chicago in 1994. As an associate professor of medicine, Chin also directed the "Finding Answers: Disparities Research For Change" program and was the co-principal investigator for a project to improve diabetes care on the South Side of Chicago. As the director of "Finding Answers", Chin helped create a six-step "Roadmap to Reduce Disparities" to help health care organizations improve minority health and foster equity.

In recognition of his efforts, Chin was appointed the Richard Parrillo Family Professor in Medicine in 2012 and named president-elect of the Society of General Internal Medicine for the 2014-2015 year. He was elected a member of the National Academy of Medicine in 2017 and the Association of American Physicians in 2019.

In 2022, Chin was named the Richard Parrillo Family Distinguished Service Professor in the Department of Medicine. While serving in this role, he also received the 2024 Robert J. Glaser Award from the Society of General Internal Medicine.
