= William J. Winslade =

American professor of Medicine

- Born: November 18, 1941 (age 84); Denver, Colorado
- Education: Monmouth College (BA); Northwestern University (PhD); University of California, Los Angeles (JD)
- Occupations: Author; research principal; professor of philosophy of medicine; attorney
- Known for: Head trauma and medical bioethics
- Notable work: Confronting Traumatic Brain Injury: Devastation, Hope and Healing (Yale University Press, 1998)
- Board member of: Monmouth College 1986–2001

William J. Winslade (born 18 November 1941) is the James Wade Rockwell Professor of Philosophy of Medicine at the Institute for Medical Humanities, University of Texas Medical Branch at Galveston and Distinguished Visiting professor of Law and associate director for Graduate Programs, Health Law & Policy Institute at the University of Houston Law Center. He is a fellow of the Hastings Center, an independent bioethics research institution.

He has written on policy issues related to traumatic brain injury, and has proposed banning boxing.

== Biography ==
Winslade was born in Denver, Colorado on 18 November 1941, to Jack L. Winslade (a veterinarian) and Lillian D. (Key) Winslade (a special education teacher). He graduated from Carlinville High School, Carlinville, Illinois in 1959. He graduated with a Bachelor of Arts degree in Philosophy from Monmouth College (Illinois), cum laude, in May 1963. He earned a Ph.D. in Philosophy in May 1967 from Northwestern University and a J.D. degree from UCLA School of Law, Order of the Coif, in December 1972 and subsequently was admitted to the California State Bar in 1974. He also received a Ph.D. in psychoanalysis in May 1984 from Southern California Psychoanalytic Institute and an honorary Doctor of Humane Letters degree from Monmouth College (Illinois) in May 1990.

He is licensed as a Research Psychoanalyst with the California Board of Medical Quality Assurance, since 1977.

Between 1968 and 2008, he was the recipient of numerous research grants including a $319,000 grant in 2000 by the National Institutes of Health, National Heart, Lung, and Blood Institute related to A Short Term Course in Ethics in Clinical Research Involving Prisoners. He also received a $310,000 grant as the Principal Investigator for The Greenwall Foundation in 2001 for investigations related to Prisoners as Patients: Ethics Education for Prison Health Professionals.

In 2008 through 2011 he was a Fellow at the Zentrum fur interdisziplinare Forschung (ZIF), Universitat Bielefeld, Germany.

Since 1970 he has written hundreds of articles in peer-reviewed journals, book chapters, book reviews, essays, and editorials. One of his six books, Confronting Traumatic Brain Injury: Devastation, Hope and Healing (Yale University Press, 1998) predates the now widespread interest in the topic.

Winslade's publications also include children's health and the law, the law and psychiatry, patients rights, prison health issues, planned death, the rights of the unconscious and their families, clinical ethics, rural geriatrics and bioethical issues.

He served on the Board of Trustees of Monmouth College (Illinois), from 1986 through 2001.

== Works ==
=== Books ===
- Insanity Plea by William J. Winslade, Judith W. Ross
- Confronting Traumatic Brain Injury: Devastation, Hope and Healing by William J. Winslade, James S. Brady (Foreword by)
- Clinical Ethics: A Practical Approach to Ethical Decisions in Clinical Medicine by Albert R. Jonsen, William J. Winslade, Mark Siegler
- Choosing Life or Death: A Guide for Patients, Families, and Professionals by William J. Winslade, Judith W. Ross
- Clinical Ethics by Albert R. Jonsen, William J. Winslade, Mark Seigler

=== Articles ===
- "Confidentiality" in Encyclopedia of Bioethics, Stephen G. Post (ed.).

== See also ==
- List of American philosophers
