= St. George's University School of Medicine =

Medical school in Grenada, West Indies

Coordinates: 12°00′00″N 61°46′26″W

St. George's University
- St. George’s University School of Medicine
- Type: Private
- Established: 1977
- Parent institution: St. George's University
- Students: 5,560
- Location: St. George's, St. George, Grenada
- Website: sgu.edu/school-of-medicine

St. George's University School of Medicine is the medical school of St. George's University located in St. George's, Grenada. The school was founded by Charles R. Modica on July 23, 1976. Because of its size, the school placed more doctors into first-year US residency positions than any other medical school in the world between 2011 and 2012. It was rated by The Princeton Review as one of the "Best 168 Medical Schools" in 2012. There are 158 accredited MD-granting institutions in the United States.

== Admissions ==
The average undergraduate GPA of accepted students is 3.4 and the average MCAT score is 497 (39th percentile), compared with 3.69 and 513 (87th percentile) respectively in the United States. The medical students at St. George's come from many universities in the United States and around the world.

The New York Times refers to St. George's as a "second chance" medical school, because many of the students attend after they are unable to gain acceptance to a US medical school. Only 65% of students who enrolled in 2009 graduated within 4 years, although another 20% graduated after 5 years.

== Academics ==
While traditional US-based medical schools do not pay hospitals to accept their students for clinical rotations, St. George's has signed a contract to pay more than $100 million to hospitals to accept their students.

Because of its large student body, SGU is the top provider of doctors into first-year US residencies for the last eight years with more than 935 placements in 2018. SGU is the international school with the greatest number of licensed physicians in the United States per the 2018 FSMB Survey with 10,791 licensed physicians. While two-thirds of its students are US citizens, its student body and faculty represent over 140 countries, and its graduates practice in more than 50 countries worldwide. As part of its focus on a global curriculum, students in the Keith B. Taylor Scholars Program pathway, or the traditional pathway can take medical electives in Prague, Thailand, India, Honduras, Kenya and Sweden, as well as health practica throughout parts of Africa, Asia, Europe, and the Americas, while also completing years three and four of medical school in the United States, the UK, or Canada.

As of 2015, tuition at St. George's medical school cost more than $250,000.

=== Academic outcomes ===
There is no available information on the St. George's University School of Medicine website as to how many students match into a residency four years after matriculating into the Doctor of Medicine program. This information is readily available for review on the websites for all accredited medical schools in the United States.

Pass rates of its students and graduates on the United States Medical Licensing Examinations (USMLE) in calendar year 2022 were as follows:
Step 1 – Basic Science 77.19%
Step 2 – Clinical Knowledge 88.81%
Step 3 – Clinical Skills N/A, CS discontinued as of Jan. 26, 2021

For reference, the pass rates among the top 110 ranked medical schools as reported by U.S. News Best Medical Schools rankings in 2019 were as follows:

Step 1 – Basic Science 96.3%

Step 2 – Clinical Knowledge 96.6%

== Student loan debt ==
The US Department of Education reports median student loan debt of Americans who attended was $521,475 in 2022. Default rate as of 2019 was 0.1%.

== Alumni ==
- Suzanne Mallouk - Canadian-born painter, psychiatrist, best known for her relationship with artist Jean-Michel Basquiat
- Rosalind Ambrose - founding member of the Caribbean Society of Radiologists
- Robert Lewis Morgan - politician who served in the New Jersey General Assembly for one term from 2004 to 2006
