= Rosalind Ambrose =

St. Vincent and the Grenadines radiologist

- Born: Rosalind Baptiste; 1953 (age 72–73); Kingstown, St Vincent, British Windward Islands
- Occupation: radiologist
- Years active: 1983–

Rosalind Ambrose (born 1953) is a Vincentian radiologist who has been instrumental in the development of the field in her country and throughout the Caribbean region. She served as Director of Education for the Kingstown Medical College, was a founding member of the Caribbean Society of Radiologists, and was President of the St. Vincent and the Grenadines Medical Association from 2001 to 2010.

== Early life ==
Rosalind Baptiste was born in 1953 in Kingstown, on the island of St Vincent, a part of the British Windward Islands. She was raised by her mother in Kingstown Park. After completion of her primary schooling, Baptiste attended St. Vincent Girls' High School and then moved to Seattle, Washington to complete a course in applied science at North Seattle Community College. She went on to further her education, earning a bachelor's degree in zoology from the University of Washington and then enrolling in St. George's University School of Medicine in Grenada in 1979 on a scholarship from the government of St. Vincent and the Grenadines. In 1982, she married a fellow student at St. George's, Dennis Ambrose, from Trinidad. Initially she wanted to pursue pediatric medicine and completed her Doctor of Medicine degree in 1983.

== Career ==
Upon her graduation, Ambrose worked in a chest surgeon's office as a medical transcriptionist, which influenced her desire to specialize in radiology. While in Trinidad, she gave birth to her oldest daughter Michaela. After completing a two-year internship, which was completed partly in St. Vincent and partly in Trinidad, she obtained a fellowship to continue her education at the Chinese University of Hong Kong completing studies on diagnostic radiology at the Prince of Wales Hospital. After completion of her studies, she was hired as a lecturer for the university and remained in Hong Kong for two more years, giving birth during this time to her second daughter, Gabriella.

Returning to St. Vincent, Ambrose worked for around eight years as the director of education at the Kingstown Medical College and taught as an associate professor on imaging for the clinical anatomy curricula. In 1998, she opened her own business, Caribbean Medical Imaging Center (CMIC), bringing the first CAT scan services to the island nation. She also introduced fluoroscopy, mammography and ultrasound, among other technologies and was the pioneer of teleradiology in St. Vincent, which allowed transmission of imaging for consultation with specialists in other parts of the world without having to travel.

Ambrose works as a consultant with the Milton Cato Memorial Hospital and was a founding member of the Caribbean Society of Radiologists (CSR) formed in 1993. For twenty-three years after the formation of the CSR, Ambrose acted as chair of the organizational committee for the annual conferences of the society. Between 2001 and 2010, she was elected and served as president of the St Vincent and the Grenadines Medical Association. Since 2008, Ambrose has served as chair of the National Accreditation Board to assure that degree standards offered by colleges and universities in Saint Vincent are accredited.
