= Mark Siegler =

American physician

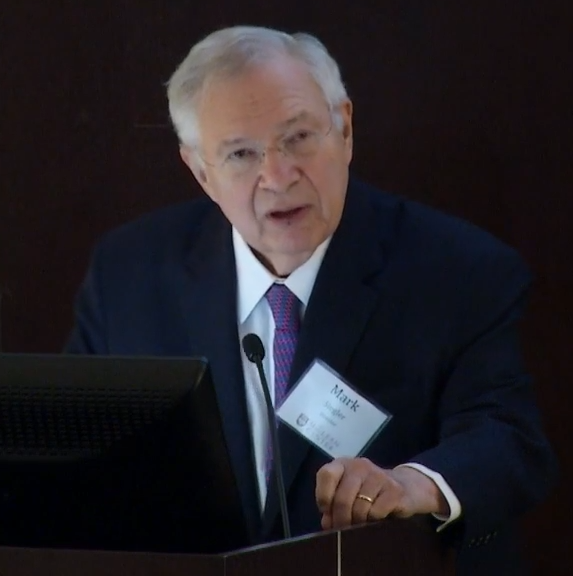
- Siegler in 2018
- Born: Mark Siegler; June 20, 1941 (age 85)
- Education: University of Chicago; Princeton University
- Scientific career
- Fields: Medicine, medical ethics
- Workplaces: University of Chicago

Mark Siegler (born June 20, 1941) is an American physician who specializes in internal medicine. He is the Lindy Bergman Distinguished Service Professor of Medicine and Surgery at the University of Chicago. He is the Founding Director of Chicago's MacLean Center for Clinical Medical Ethics.

In 2011, the Matthew and Carolyn Bucksbaum Family Foundation presented an endowment of $42 million to the University of Chicago to create the Bucksbaum Institute for Clinical Excellence. Siegler was appointed the executive director of the institute.

Siegler has published more than 215 journal articles, 65 book chapters and five books. His textbook, co-authored with Al Jonsen and William Winslade, Clinical Ethics: A Practical Approach to Ethical Decisions in Clinical Medicine, 8th Edition (2015), has been translated into eight languages and is widely used by physicians and health professionals around the world. One of his most recent books, co-edited with Laura Roberts, is Clinical Medical Ethics: Landmark Works of Mark Siegler, MD. DSigler retired from practicing medicine in 2024.

== Research ==
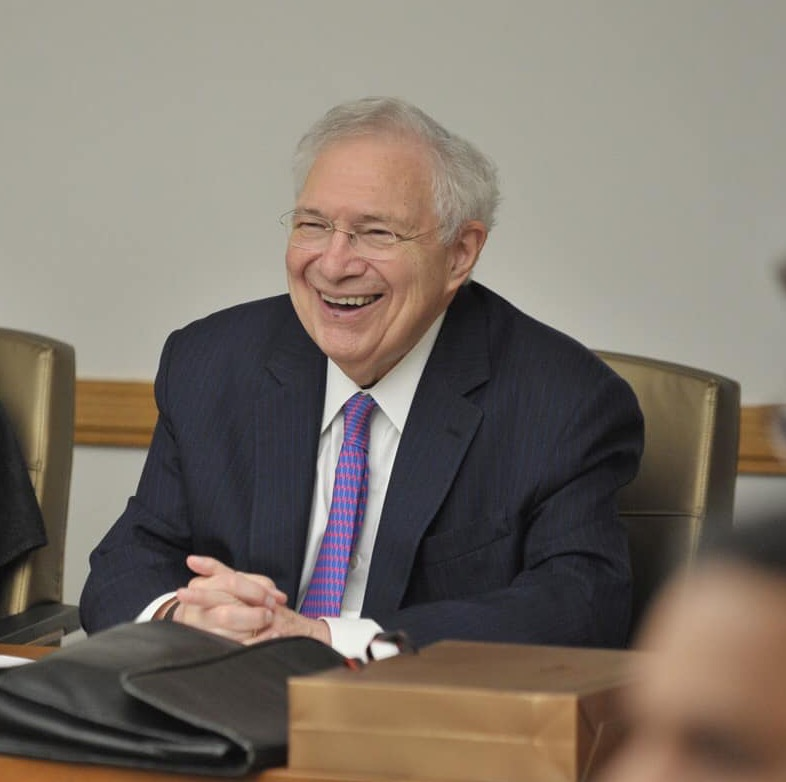
Mark Siegler at the MacLean Center for Clinical Medical Ethics

He has developed a field called Clinical Medical Ethics, the main goal of which is improving the quality of patient care by identifying, analyzing, and contributing to the resolution of ethical problems that arise in the routine practice of clinical medicine. He also supervised the initiation of Consultations in Clinical Ethics as a hospital service and developed the oldest and largest Clinical Medical Ethics fellowship in the world.

== Selected awards and honors ==
- 2010 - Lifetime Achievement Award from the American Society of Bioethics and Humanities (ASBH)
- 2013 - MacLean Center received the Cornerstone Award from the American Society of Bioethics and Humanities
- 2015 - Elected a Master of the American College of Physicians (MACP)
- 2021 - Arthur Rubenstein Mentorship Award from the University of Chicago
- 2021 - Norman Maclean Faculty Award from the Alumni Board in recognition of his extraordinary contributions over 50 years to teaching at the University of Chicago.
- 2024 - Gold Key Award in recognition of outstanding and loyal service to the Division of the Biological Sciences and to the University of Chicago

== Selected books ==
- Jonsen AR, Siegler M, Winslade WJ. Clinical Ethics: A Practical Approach to Ethical Decisions in Clinical Medicine. 8th Edition. New York: McGraw-Hill, Inc., 2015.
- Roberts L, Siegler M, eds. Clinical Medical Ethics: Landmark Works and the Legacy of Mark Siegler, MD. New York: Springer, 2017.
- Rogers S, Siegler M Violence, Trauma, and Trauma Surgery: Ethical Issues, Interventions, and Innovations. Springer, 2022
