= Daniel Sulmasy =

American medical ethicist

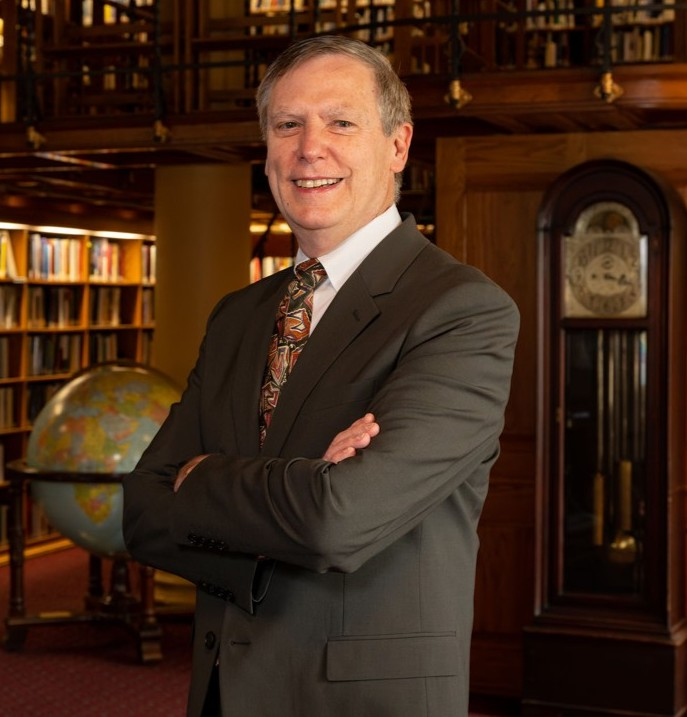
- Daniel Sulmasy
- Education: Cornell University (BA, MD); Georgetown University (PhD)
- Scientific career
- Fields: Medicine; medical ethics
- Workplaces: Georgetown University

Daniel Sulmasy is an American medical ethicist. He has been the director of the Kennedy Institute of Ethics since January 2021 and also serves on the faculty of the Pellegrino Center for Clinical Bioethics. He is the inaugural André Hellegers Professor of Biomedical Ethics, with co-appointments in the departments of philosophy and medicine at Georgetown University.

== Biography ==
Sulmasy holds a Ph.D from Georgetown University and an M.D from Cornell University, and he completed his residency, chief residency, and post-doctoral fellowship in General Internal Medicine at the Johns Hopkins Hospital.

=== Career ===
His research interests encompass both theoretical and empirical investigations of the ethics of end-of-life decision-making, ethics education, and spirituality in medicine. He has done extensive work on the role of intention in medical action, especially as it relates to the rule of double effect and the distinction between killing and allowing to die. He is also interested in the philosophy of medicine and the logic of diagnostic and therapeutic reasoning. His work in spirituality is focused primarily on the spiritual dimensions of the practice of medicine. His empirical studies have explored topics such as decision-making by surrogates on behalf of patients who are nearing death, and informed consent for biomedical research. He continues to practice medicine part-time as a member of the University faculty practice.

He has previously held faculty positions at the University of Chicago and New York Medical College. He has served on numerous governmental advisory committees, and served on the Presidential Commission for the Study of Bioethical Issues from 2010-2017. He has also been a member of the Program Committee of the Greenwall Foundation Faculty Scholars Program in Bioethics.

He holds emeritus status at the University of Chicago, where he was Kilbride-Clinton Professor of Medicine and Ethics in the Department of Medicine and Divinity School, Associate Director of the MacLean Center for Clinical Medical Ethics in the Department of Medicine, and Director of the Program on Medicine and Religion.

=== Personal life ===
A former Franciscan friar, in 2015, he wed Lois Snyder, Director of the American College of Physicians Center for Ethics and Professionalism.

== Publications and lectures ==
He is the author or editor of six books: The Healer's Calling (1997), Methods in Medical Ethics (2001; 2nd ed. 2010, 3rd ed. 2026), The Rebirth of the Clinic (2006), A Balm for Gilead (2006), Safe Passage: A Global Spiritual Sourcebook for Care at the End of Life (2013), and Francis the Leper: Faith, Medicine, Theology, and Science (2014). He also serves as editor-in-chief of the journal Theoretical Medicine and Bioethics.

- The Healer's Calling (1997)
- Methods in Medical Ethics (1st ed., 2001; 2nd ed., 2010, 3rd ed., 2026)
- The Rebirth of the Clinic (2006)
- A Balm for Gilead (2006)
- Safe Passage: A Global Spiritual Sourcebook for Care at the End of Life (2014)
- Francis the Leper: Faith, Medicine, Theology, and Science (2014)
- Physician Assisted Suicide and Euthanasia: Before, During, and After the Holocaust (2020)
- He is currently working on another book on the ethical and spiritual aspects of care at the end of life entitled, The Hours of Our Dying (under contract with Oxford University Press).
- He is the editor of Theoretical Medicine and Bioethics
- Articles: Sulmasy has authored or co-authored over 200 peer-reviewed articles in prestigious journals such as The New England Journal of Medicine, JAMA, Annals of Internal Medicine, The Journal of Clinical Oncology, The Hastings Center Report, and the Kennedy Institute of Ethics Journal. He has also published 45 book chapters.
- He has given frequent press commentary on bioethical issues for such venues as The New York Times, The Washington Post, the LA Times, CNN, NPR, ABC, NBC, and Fox.
- He is featured in the 2017 public television documentary, Your Health: A Sacred Matter.

== Awards and honors ==
- Hastings Center Fellow. 2004
- The Johns Hopkins Society of Scholars. 2007
- Pellegrino Medal, Samford University. 2009
- Paul Ramsey Award for Excellence in Bioethics. 2014
- Master of the American College of Physicians. 2015
- Linacre Award. 2017
- Excellence in Medical Ethics Award, Society of General Internal Medicine. 2024
- H.T. Engelhardt Award, OSU Center for Bioethics and Medical Humanities. 2026

=== Grants ===
- National Cancer Institute
- National Institute of Nursing Research
- John Templeton Foundation
