= Bucksbaum Institute for Clinical Excellence =

American-based research organization

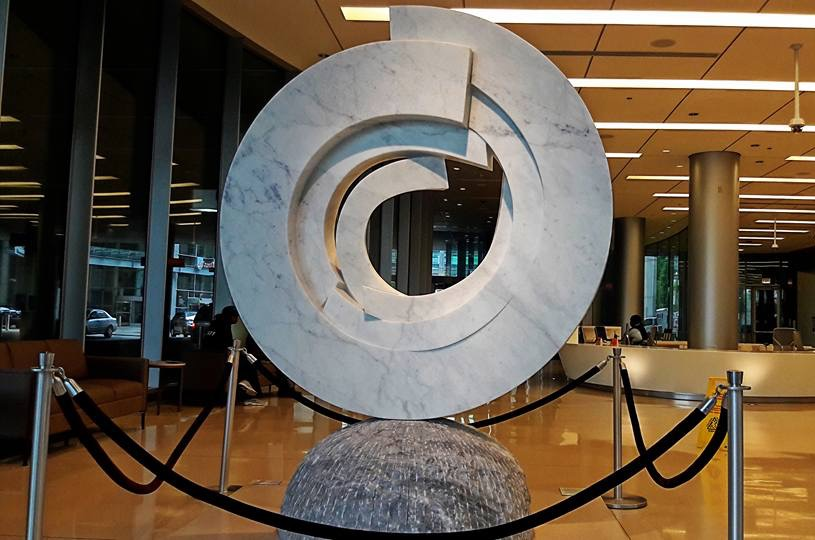
- “Caring” sculpture commissioned by Bucksbaum Institute for Clinical Excellence
- Founded: 2011
- Headquarters: The University of Chicago
- Location: Chicago, Illinois, United States
- Director: Mark Siegler, MD
- Website: bucksbauminstitute.uchicago.edu

The Bucksbaum Institute for Clinical Excellence was established in September 2011 with a $42 million endowment gift from the Matthew and Carolyn Bucksbaum Family Foundation. The Institute's mission is to improve patient care, strengthen the doctor-patient relationship, enhance communication and decision-making in healthcare, and reduce healthcare disparities through research and education programs for medical students, junior faculty, and master clinicians of the Institute.

== Mission and Objectives ==
The primary objectives of the Bucksbaum Institute are:

1. Improving Patient Care: Enhancing the quality of care provided to patients.
2. Strengthening the Doctor-Patient Relationship: Fostering a collaborative and trust-based relationship between doctors and patients.
3. Enhancing Communication and Decision-Making: Improving communication and decision-making processes in healthcare settings.
4. Reducing Healthcare Disparities: Addressing and reducing disparities in healthcare access and outcomes.

== Core Programming and Initiatives ==
The Bucksbaum Institute has developed a range of programs and initiatives to fulfill its mission:

=== Core Programming ===
- Schwartz Rounds: Hosted in partnership with the University of Chicago Medicine Biological Sciences Division Office of Faculty Affairs, these rounds provide healthcare providers with opportunities to discuss resilience, work-life harmony, and the impact of technology on the doctor-patient relationship.
- Pilot Grant Program: This program encourages and supports faculty research, awarding over $215,000 in pilot grants to Bucksbaum Scholars in the past year alone.

=== Education and Mentorship ===
- Junior and Senior Scholars: The Institute selects classes of Junior Scholars, Senior Scholars, and a Master Clinician annually.
- Medical Student Involvement: The Institute selects Bucksbaum Medical Student Scholars starting in their first year of medical school and funds students pursuing scholarly work related to its mission.

== Innovations and Future Directions ==
The Bucksbaum Institute is continually exploring new programs and initiatives, including:

- hArt of Medicine Physician Coaching Program: Expanding to train more physicians as coaches.
- Patients as Teachers Event Series: Providing insight into the experiences of patients with chronic illness, oncology/clinical trials, and trauma.
