= Journal of Cancer Research and Clinical Oncology =

- Discipline: Oncology
- Language: English, German
- Edited by: Klaus Hoffken

Publication details
- Former names: Zeitschrift für Krebsforschung, Zeitschrift für Krebsforschung und klinische Onkologie
- History: 1903-present
- Publisher: Springer Science+Business Media
- Frequency: Monthly
- Impact factor: 4.322 (2021)

Standard abbreviations
- ISO 4: J. Cancer Res. Clin. Oncol.

Indexing
- CODEN: JCROD7
- ISSN: 0171-5216 (print); 1432-1335 (web)
- OCLC no.: 525582786

Links
- Journal homepage; Online archive

The Journal of Cancer Research and Clinical Oncology is a monthly peer-reviewed medical journal covering oncology. It was established in 1903 under the name Zeitschrift für Krebsforschung, and changed its name to Zeitschrift für Krebsforschung und klinische Onkologie in 1971. The journal obtained its current name in 1979. It is published by Springer Science+Business Media under a hybrid publishing model and the editor-in-chief is Klaus Hoffken (University of Düsseldorf).

According to the Journal Citation Reports, the journal has a 2021 impact factor of 4.322. The journal is abstracted and indexed in PubMed, MEDLINE, Scopus, and others.
