= Theoretical Medicine and Bioethics =

- Discipline: Bioethics, philosophy of medicine
- Language: English
- Edited by: Daniel Sulmasy, Lynn Jansen

Publication details
- Former names: Metamedicine, Theoretical Medicine
- History: 1980–present
- Publisher: Springer Nature
- Frequency: Bimonthly
- Open access: Hybrid
- Impact factor: 0.789 (2018)

Standard abbreviations
- ISO 4: Theor. Med. Bioeth.

Indexing
- ISSN: 1386-7415 (print); 1573-1200 (web)
- LCCN: 98641608
- OCLC no.: 905577181

Links
- Journal homepage; Online archive

Theoretical Medicine and Bioethics: Philosophy of Medical Research and Practice is a bimonthly peer-reviewed medical journal covering bioethics and the philosophy of medicine with a more theoretical outlook than other journals in this area. It was established in 1980 as Metamedicine and was renamed Theoretical Medicine in 1983, obtaining its current name in 1998. It is published by Springer Nature and offered at a reduced rate to members of the American Society for Bioethics and Humanities. The editors-in-chief are Lynn Jansen (University of Arizona) and Daniel Sulmasy (Georgetown University). According to the Journal Citation Reports, the journal has a 2018 impact factor of 0.789.
