= Free the Bears Fund =

Australian Wildlife Charity

The Free the Bears Fund (FBF) is an Australian charitable wildlife-protection organisation, started by Mary Hutton.

The FBF plans to halt the spread of bear bile farming and protect wild bears from the threat of the illegal wildlife trade. With bears in each country facing a unique set of issues that threaten their future, Free the Bears employs a range of strategies including environmental education, conservation research, and strengthened law enforcement regarding illegal farming.

== History and achievements ==
Free the Bears was initially formed as a petition group in 1993, in response to Australian Television program A Current Affair airing a segment containing footage of moon bears being regularly milked for their bile.

On 23 March 1995, Free the Bears Fund was registered as a not-for-profit charitable organization in Perth, Australia. A UK charity - Free the Bears UK (charities number 1135682) - was formed in 2010 and in 2018 the Australian charity adjusted its constitution to that of a public company limited by guarantee, collectively making up the global group Free the Bears.

The organization fought for several of the Sun bears to be brought to Australia to start a regional breeding program as Free the Bears began construction of the Cambodian Bear Sanctuary at the Phnom Tamao Wildlife Rescue Centre. This is now the world's largest sanctuary for Sun bears, educating hundreds of thousands of Cambodians about the threats facing their wild bear populations each year.

Further requests for help arrived, and Free the Bears was soon involved in projects throughout Southeast Asia and further afield. Free the Bears joined Wildlife SOS and International Animal Rescue in an attempt to rescue India's "dancing" bears. The first group of 25 rescued bears entered the Agra Bear Rescue Facility on Christmas Eve, 2002. Over the next seven years, Free the Bears provided seed money for more than 500 families to abandon the practice of "dancing" bears and adopt new sustainable livelihoods. Less than seven years after the first "dancing" bears were rescued, the last of India's "dancing" bears were handed over to the sanctuary.

The Free the Bears supports animal welfare projects in Cambodia, India, Indonesia, Laos, Thailand and Vietnam, working with rescued and confiscated Asian black bear (Ursus thibetanus), sun bear (Helarctos malayanus), and sloth bear (Melursus ursinus). A sister charity, Free the Bears UK was established in the United Kingdom in 2010.

== See also ==
- Bile bear
- Animals Asia Foundation
