= Keetham Lake =

Lake in India

- Location within Agra Administrative
- Location: Agra, India
- Coordinates: 27.253295°N 77.843875°E
- Basin countries: India

Ramsar Wetland
- Official name: Sur Sarovar
- Designated: 21 August 2020
- Reference no.: 2440

Sur Sarovar, often referred to as Keetham Lake, is a picturesque lake off the Agra-Delhi national highway (NH-19). The Agra Bear Rescue Facility, a facility for saving Sloth bears dedicated to rehabilitating previously captured "dancing bears," is located next to it. Since 2020, the lake has been recognized as a Ramsar site that is protected.

There are over two dozen species of resident and migratory birds living in this bird sanctuary. This charming retreat for the adventure-seeking tourist has a large lake and numerous man-made islands that add to its splendour. The form of Keetham Lake is pentagonal.

== Location ==
This scenic lake, is about 20 km from Agra and 12 km from sikandra is located within the Sur Sarovar Bird Sanctuary. Keetham Lake is linked by Railway track at Keetham Railway Station and was declared as National Bird Sanctuary on 27 March 1991 by U.P. Forest Department. The riverine belt of River Yamuna surrounds the area of Sur-Sarovar.

The entire lake is formed in a catchment area of 7.13 km^{2}. Keetham Lake is pentagonal in shape. There are artificially created islands for shelter and breeding grounds for the migratory birds. The best thing is that is placed on the way of Delhi and tourist can visit during their journey to Agra.

== Climate ==
The climatic conditions of the lake area is typical of Uttar Pradesh plains with hot windy summers and cold winters. The temperature recorded ranges between 1.5 C to 48 C. The monsoon season occurs from July to September.

== Water Management ==
The raw water for Keetham Lake is obtained from Agra Canal originating from Okhla barrage on River Yamuna in Delhi. At Delhi Agra road, the Agra Canal water is diverted through Jodhpur branch near Anand Engineering College located about 2 km from Keetham. The lake water of Keetham is also used as raw water intake for Mathura Refinery Water Treatment Plant located in vicinity of Keetham Lake

== Development ==
U.P. Forest Department has created woodlands and developed shallow areas near lake, making it a natural habitat for birds nesting sites. Controversially, Uttar Pradesh Government has decided to reduce the Eco-sensitive zone limit around Keetham Lake from 10 kilometres to just 250 metres.

== Wildlife ==
More than 106 species of migratory and resident birds are known to have their resting habitats at Sur Sarovar. The entire lake area gets covered by profuse growth of aquatic_plants like water hyacinth and Potamogeton species during summers. The water quality of Keetham lake supports wide range of avifauna during the winter season. Waterbirds in Keetham lake area are little grebe, Cormorants, darter, grey heron, purple heron, cattle egret, large egret, little egret, night heron, black-necked stork, white ibis, Eurasian spoonbill, bar-headed goose, lesser whistling teal, ruddy shelduck, Northern pintail, common teal, Indian spot-billed duck, gadwall, wigeon, shoveler and comb duck.

Within Sur Sarovar Bird Sanctuary is the Agra Bear Rescue Facility, which is a sloth bear rescue facility dedicated to rehabilitating previously enslaved 'dancing bears'. Established in 1999 by Wildlife SOS in collaboration with the Uttar Pradesh Forest Department and others, the facility is located in an eight-hectare site. It currently houses over 170 sloth bears as well as other wildlife. Agra Bear Rescue Facility also does advanced research, disease management and provides specialised veterinary care as well as geriatric care for sloth bears. The facility is available for tours by small groups of people.

== See also ==
- Patna Bird Sanctuary
- National Chambal (Gharial) Wildlife Sanctuary
- List of lakes of Uttar Pradesh
