= International Animal Rescue =

Animal protection and conservation non-profit organisation

- Type: Charity
- Industry: Animal welfare
- Founded: 1989
- Headquarters: United Kingdom
- Key people: John Hicks, Alan Knight OBE, CEO
- Website: www.internationalanimalrescue.org

International Animal Rescue (IAR) is a British wildlife protection and conservation non-profit organisation. IAR aims to protect and mitigate threats to wildlife and habitats.

IAR performs hands-on rescue when necessary to reduce the suffering of animals, aiming to rehabilitate and return them to the wild if possible. Animals that cannot be released are provided with permanent sanctuary.

Its work includes freeing and caring for captive bears in India and Armenia, rescuing and rehabilitating orangutans and other primates in Indonesia, and treating injured and orphaned wildlife in Costa Rica. IAR strives to educate the public in the humane treatment of all animals and the preservation of the natural environment. International Animal Rescue has offices in the United Kingdom and the United States.

== History ==
International Animal Rescue was registered as a charity in the UK in 1989, with Alan Knight as chairman. The organisation began by running a sanctuary in the southwest of England for domestic and farm animals. In 1998, it opened a clinic in Goa, India, for stray dogs and cats.

In 1993, IAR was also registered as a charity in Malta to tackle the killing of migratory birds by hunters.

IAR India collaborated with various other groups and individuals to help animals. In 2022, IAR worked with the Delhi-based Wildlife SOS (WSOS) to rescue dancing bears from the streets of India. They first helped fund the completion of the first sloth bear sanctuary in India – the Agra Bear Rescue Facility (ABRF). As part of the project, job opportunities were created for the Kalandars, a nomadic tribe in India who were the original bear handlers. These people were supplied with seed money to retrain and set up small businesses. In 2009, the coalition of Wildlife SOS, IAR, and Free the Bears Foundation in Australia celebrated the rescue of the last dancing bear from the streets.

International Animal Rescue was first registered in Indonesia in 2006 under the local name Yayasan IAR Indonesia (YIARI). Its aim was to aid primates (initially macaques and slow lorises) and tackle deforestation. In 2007, YIARI built a rescue and rehabilitation centre on the island of Java for primates rescued from the pet trade, including macaques and lorises.

In 2009, YIARI's programme director in Indonesia, vet Karmele Llano Sanchez, treated a wound caused by a shackle on a captive orangutan in Pontianak, West Borneo. This led YIARI to rescue that orangutan, named JoJo, and a second one known as Jingo. The operation marked the beginning of YIARI's orangutan rescue and rehabilitation project, which first operated out of a small, temporary facility in Ketapang, West Borneo. In 2010, YIARI purchased 60 acres of land to build a permanent facility, and construction soon began.

Upon completion, the facility was accredited by the Global Federation of Animal Sanctuaries (GFAS). In June 2014, YIARI's primate rehabilitation centre in West Java joined the orangutan facility in receiving GFAS accreditation.

The El Niño weather event in 2015 caused the destruction of 5,000 acres of rainforest surrounding YIARI's orangutan rehabilitation centre in Ketapang and the loss of more than five million acres nationwide. Consequently, YIARI took in 40 orangutans whose habitats were destroyed.

IAR's "Tickling is Torture" campaign, also launched in 2015, was designed to expose the cruelty of keeping slow lorises as pets. The campaign gathered 700,000 signatures and reached an audience of more than 150 million people. Additionally, a tree-planting project that aimed to plant 650,000 trees and reforest an area of land lost in the fires was launched by YIARI in 2016. In the same year, International Animal Rescue won JustGiving's Charity of the Year. The following year, IAR began supporting Nosara's Refuge for Wildlife, to help care for injured and orphaned howler monkeys and other wildlife in Costa Rica.

Also in 2017, with partners the Foundation for the Preservation of Wildlife and Cultural Assets (FPWC), IAR launched a campaign to rescue as many as 80 caged bears living in poor conditions in Armenia. In 2018, two young bears were released into the wild after rehabilitation with a minimum of human contact. This was the first time in Armenia that bears had been reintroduced into the wild.

In 2019, International Animal Rescue won The Charity Award in the Environment and Conservation category for its reforestation project in Indonesia.

The Sir Michael Uren Learning Centre in Ketapang was inaugurated on 10 July 2019. The centre is named after philanthropist Sir Michael Uren.

In 2020, alongside local Indonesian authorities, YIARI received an award from the BBVA Foundation in Spain in the category of biodiversity for an "innovative and integrated approach to protecting biodiversity in the Bukit Baka Bukit Raya National Park (TNBBBR) and several iconic species including orangutans". The BBVA Foundation Awards for Biodiversity Conservation distinguish nature conservation initiatives based on best scientific knowledge and pursuing outcomes of broad and lasting impact.

In 2023, IAR's new rescue centre was opened in Nosara, Costa Rica, with assistance from the Michael Uren Foundation. The Sir Michael Uren Wildlife Rescue and Education Centre has the capacity to house up to 200 residents at a time, allowing the team to take in more wildlife, although the centre's main focus remains rehabilitation and release. The education centre is part of the facility, enabling the IAR team to educate the community about the threats facing local wildlife and teach them how to build a healthy relationship between people and animals. The centre was featured on the "Forest" episode of the BBC series, Mammals.

== Dancing bear rescue and rehabilitation ==
Rescued dancing bears in the sanctuary.

The practice of dancing bears was made illegal in India in 1972 but in the decades that followed sloth bears were still poached from the wild and forced to perform for tourists.

In 2002, International Animal Rescue, together with Indian partner organisation Wildlife SOS, opened the first sanctuary for rescued dancing bears near Agra and the Taj Mahal.

In December 2009, International Animal Rescue and Wildlife SOS ended the practice by rescuing Raju, the last dancing bear in India.

The rescued bears live in a semi-natural environment in sanctuaries in the Agra Bear Rescue Facility, Agra and Bannerghatta National Park, near Bangalore.

The rehabilitation of the bears' handlers formed an integral part of the project, ensuring they would not revert to bear dancing as a way of earning a living. The Kalandar tribespeople who danced the bears were taught new trades such as rickshaw driving or carpet weaving to help them support their families.

== Primate rescue and rehabilitation ==
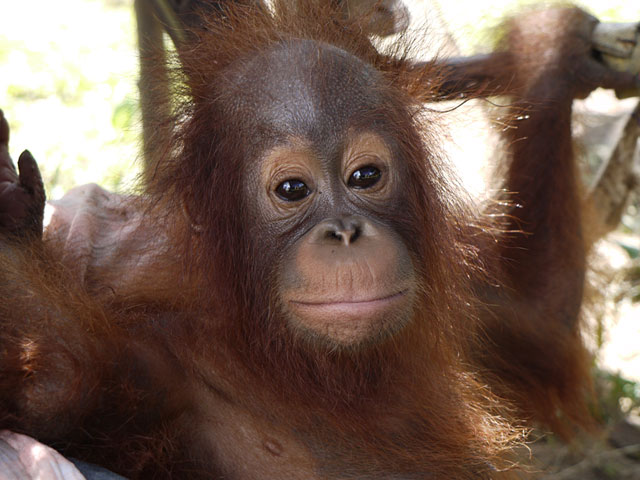
Rescued infant orangutan at IAR's centre in Ketapang.

In 2013, IAR established the first rescue and rehabilitation centre for orangutans in the province of West Kalimantan, Borneo. The centre is in the village of Sungai Awan (often abbreviated to Sei Awan), approximately a 30-minute drive from the town of Ketapang. The site covers 150 hectares and houses rescued orangutans as well as being a base from which all conservation programmes are run. The centre has allowed the rescue of more than 250 orangutans and offers rehabilitative care which has seen more than 160 orangutans returned to protected national parks.

In 2007, the primate rehabilitation centre was established in the rainforest of Ciapus, near Bogor, on the island of Java. This is the only centre in Indonesia to specialise in the rescue and rehabilitation of slow lorises, providing veterinary and rehabilitative care to victims of the illegal pet trade. In addition to rescue, rehabilitation and release, this centre provides offices from which the team campaigns and assists local authorities in efforts to tackle the illegal trade of slow lorises.

YIARI, International Animal Rescue's Indonesian partners, run a number of holistic conservation and social initiatives including reforestation, habitat protection, wildlife protection patrols, organic farming training, the provision of alternate livelihoods and the establishment of "The Power of Mama", Indonesia's first all-female firefighting force.

== Armenia bear rescue ==
In October 2017, IAR partnered with Armenian group Foundation for the Preservation of Wildlife and Cultural Assets (FPWC) to free brown bears being kept in captivity across Armenia. The Wildlife Rescue Centre in Urtsadzor, Armenia, was opened on 15 December 2017 as part of this work.

== Dog welfare ==
Female street dog and pup at IAR's centre in Goa.

In 1998, International Animal Rescue set up a rescue centre called Animal Tracks in the town of Mapusa in the north of Goa, India, to address the welfare issues of the stray dog population. The sterilisation and vaccination programmes reduced the numbers of strays and, as a result of the anti-rabies vaccinations, cases of rabies in humans were eliminated in the areas where IAR operates.

International Animal Rescue's veterinary centre in Trichy, Tamil Nadu, was established in 2005 by Dr Deike Schacht. The centre's aim was to control and care for the stray dog population with sterilisation and vaccination, and to provide shelter and treatment for sick and injured dogs.

== Cat welfare ==
International Animal Rescue's veterinary teams in India and Indonesia routinely sterilise stray cats as a means of reducing and controlling their populations.

Through Catastrophes Cat Rescue, International Animal Rescue gives sanctuary to unwanted cats in the United Kingdom. The cats receive veterinary treatment and are spayed or neutered.

== Bird protection ==
Injured osprey in the care of IAR Malta.

International Animal Rescue joined the campaign to end the illegal shooting of migrating birds in Malta in 1990 and lobbied at a national and European level for greater bird protection while working closely with the police and the Ministry of Environment and Rural Affairs to help animals in need. IAR also provided a 24-hour emergency helpline where inquiries were taken about abandoned animals, illegal bird hunting and trapping, wildlife trafficking and instances of animal cruelty.

For many years, International Animal Rescue was involved in the campaign to end illegal hunting in Malta by supporting the work of the wildlife protection unit of the police, the Administrative Law Enforcement (ALE). Every spring and autumn, IAR would assist the Committee Against Bird Slaughter (CABS) at their bird protection camps. Volunteer bird guards recruited from all over the world and trained by CABS are based in Malta to monitor migration and record any illegal shooting or trapping. A control room is set up and staffed day and night and the police are alerted immediately to any illegal activity so that their patrols can respond swiftly and track down the culprits. Conservationists come from all over Europe and some from further afield to take part in the camps and help stop the killing of thousands of birds every year.
