= Agra Bear Rescue Facility =

Sloth bear rescue centre in Agra, Uttar Pradesh, India

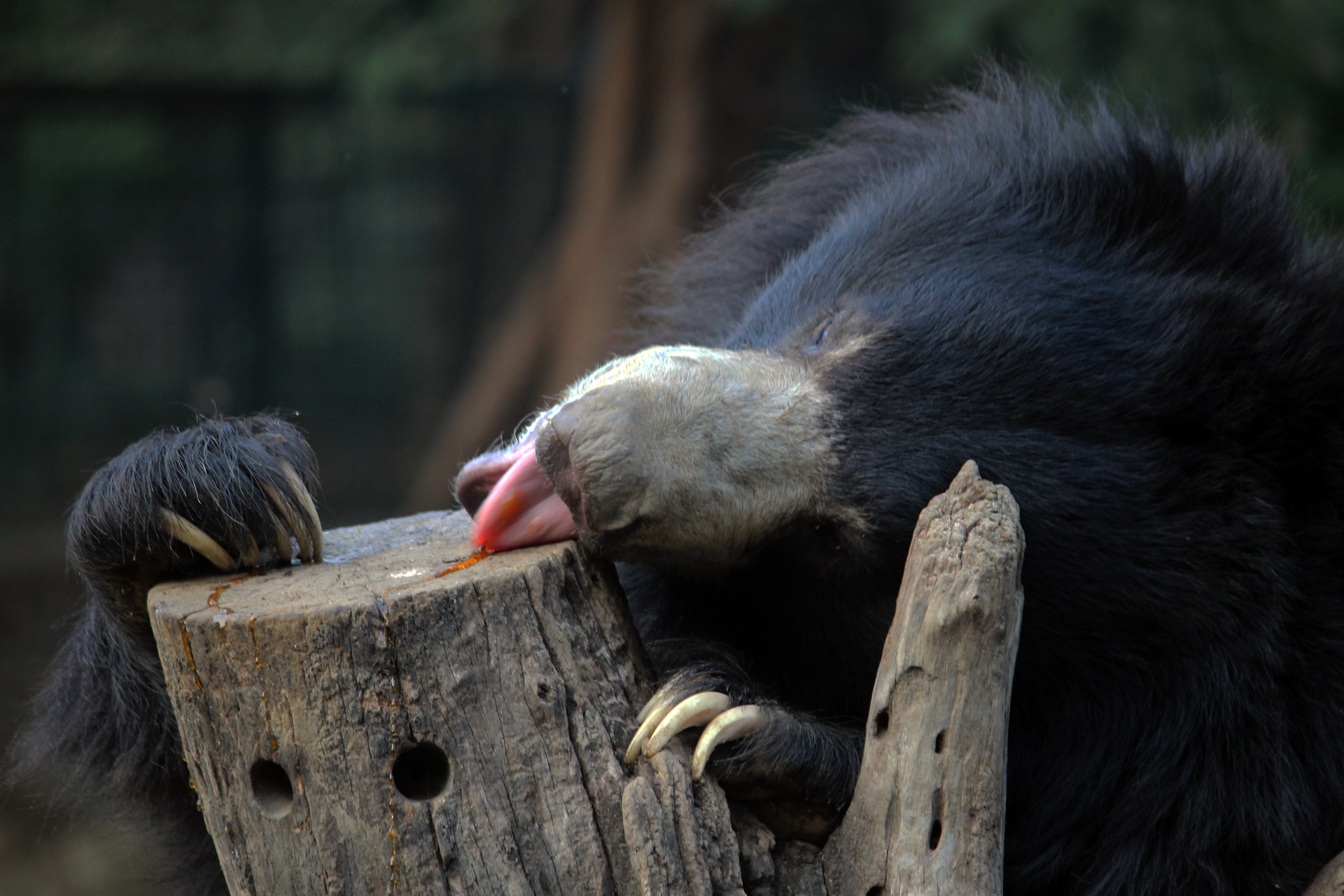
- A rescued bear at Agra Bear Rescue Facility: He was named Amitabh.
- Interactive map of Agra Bear Rescue Facility
- 27°14′9″N 77°51′7″E
- Date opened: 1999
- Location: inside the Sur Sarovar Bird Sanctuary, also known as Keetham Lake
- No. of animals: Over 170 sloth bears
- Major exhibits: Sloth bear
- Owner: Wildlife SOS
- Management: Wildlife SOS, Uttar Pradesh Forest Department, International Animal Rescue, One Voice, Free The Bears and others.
- Website: Official website

The Agra Bear Rescue Facility is a Sloth bear rescue facility dedicated to rehabilitating previously enslaved 'dancing bears'. Established in 1999 by Wildlife SOS in collaboration with the Uttar Pradesh Forest Department and others, the facility is located in an eight-hectare site inside the Sur Sarovar Bird Sanctuary(also known as Keetham Lake), 17 km west of Agra. It is one of the four facilities in India operated by Wildlife SOS for this purpose, and helped in the eradication of the 'dancing bear' practice in India. It currently houses over 170 sloth bears as well as other wildlife. Agra Bear Rescue Facility also does advanced research, disease management and provides specialised veterinary care as well as geriatric care for sloth bears. The facility is available for tours by small groups of people.

== History and Overview ==
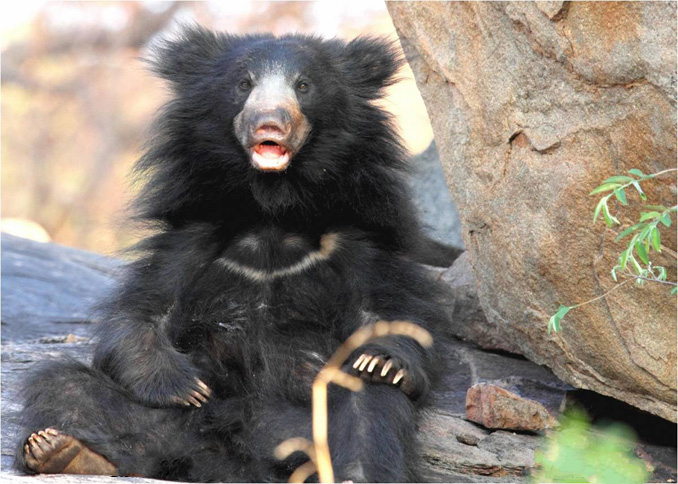
The Sloth Bear.

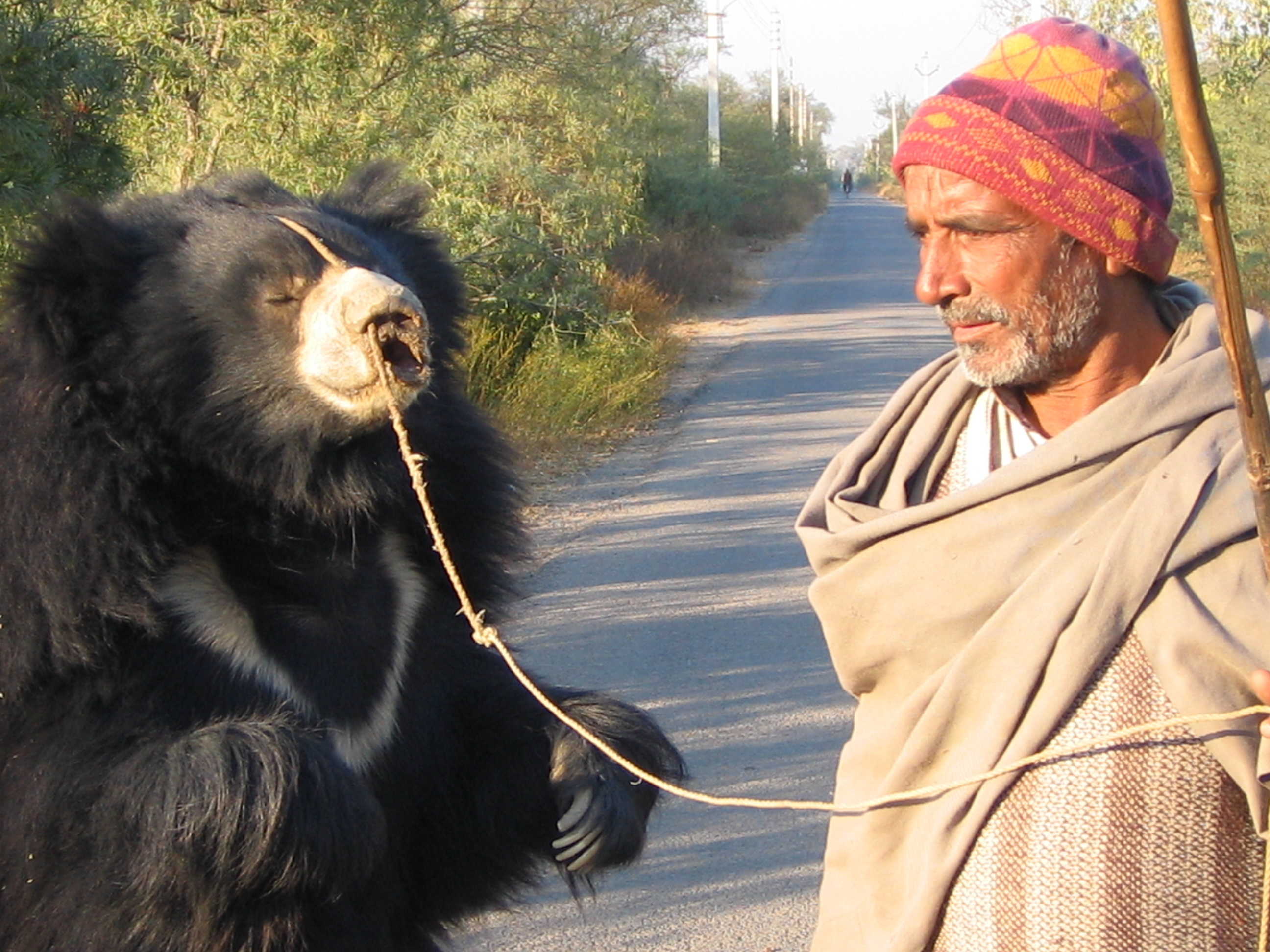
A dancing bear and its Kalandar Master.

The sloth bear (Melurus ursinus) is a medium-sized omnivorous species of bear found in the Indian subcontinent, predominantly India, with a small population in Nepal and Bhutan, and a sub-species in Sri Lanka. It is listed as vulnerable on the IUCN Red list.

For over 400 years, the Sloth Bear had been a target for human exploitation. A nomadic tribe known as the Kalandars began keeping 'dancing' sloth bears which entertained Mughal emperors. Over the centuries, the 'dancing' bear trade transitioned to become cheap roadside entertainment for villagers and tourists who paid to watch the bears.

The practice of enslaving bears for use as 'dancing' bears has been illegal in India under the Wildlife Protection Act 1972. However this rule was not well enforced, and as a result hundreds of bears remained enslaved. The bears were poached from the forests as cubs, their mothers often killed, and sold in illegal markets to Kalandars, who have used the dancing bears as a source of income for centuries. With no anaesthesia, a metal rod would be inserted through their muzzle so that a rope or nose ring can be attached and they spent much of their lives in pain chained to a stake or in a cage. Their canine teeth were crudely knocked out, and the bears were beaten into submission to teach them to perform.

In 1996, Wildlife SOS's research indicated that there were more than 1200 'dancing' bears scattered throughout India. In collaboration with the Uttar Pradesh Forest Department, International Animal Rescue, One Voice, Free The Bears, and others, Wildlife SOS established the Agra Bear Rescue Facility to rehabilitate bears.

== Bear rehabilitation process ==
On arrival to the facility, the rescued bears undergo a 90-day quarantine to prevent spread of any infectious disease to any other bear. Other immediate procedures include a complete health checkup where bears are treated for any diseases, wounds and parasites. The bear receives vaccination for many diseases like Rabies, Leptospirosis and infectious canine hepatitis. Once the quarantine period ends, the bears are encouraged to go into large socialisation enclosures with other bears where the behaviour and personality of each bear is monitored by Wildlife SOS staff.

After this process, the bear is matched to a group based on its personality, and then moved to a larger free-range area. The facility has full-time wildlife veterinary doctors and bear keepers. The bear hospital features a laboratory, along with X-ray, Ultrasound, Dental suite, Operation theatre and other equipments. The facility also includes a special cub weaning area which is dedicated to foster rescued baby bears.

Because the bears have been captive most of their lives, its unlikely they can ever be released into the wild, but the goal of Wildlife SOS is to eradicate the practice of dancing bears which has been illegal in India since 1972 but still enslaves bears, and thus stop the poaching of cubs. An important part of this is finding an alternative source of income for the Kalandar tribespeople and educating them about the cruelty of their former profession. A number of young Kalandar men are even employed at the facility helping care for the bears.

== Tours ==
The facility is available for tours, with a payment of entry fee to the Forest Department in order to access the facility, when last checked.
