= Patna Bird Sanctuary =

Protected area in Uttar Pradesh, India

- IUCN category IV (habitat/species management area)
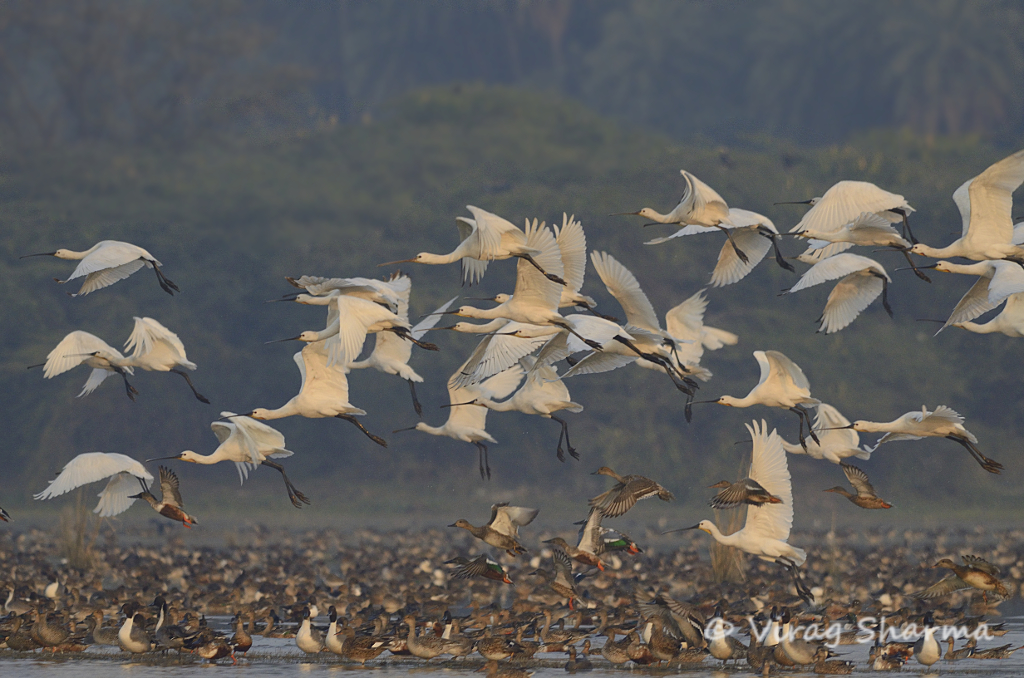
- Waterbirds at the lake

- Location within Uttar Pradesh Location within India
- Interactive map of Patna Bird Sanctuary
- Location: Etah district, Uttar Pradesh, India
- Coordinates: 27°31′5″N 78°16′50″E
- Area: 109 ha (270 acres)
- Created: 1991
- Governing body: Uttar Pradesh State Forest Department

Ramsar Wetland
- Official name: Patna Bird Sanctuary
- Designated: 4 December 2025
- Reference no.: 2589

Patna Bird Sanctuary is a protected area in Uttar Pradesh's Etah district encompassing a lentic lake that is an important wintering ground for migrating birds.. It is situated near a town Jalesar which is also known as Ghungroo Nagari or Bell City. It was founded in 1991 and covers an area of 1.09 km^{2} (0.42 sq mi). With a lake area of only 1 km^{2} (0.39 sq mi), it is the smallest bird sanctuary in Uttar Pradesh. The sanctuary has been designated as a protected Ramsar site since 2026.

The water quality of the lake supports a wide range of avifauna during winter season. The entire lake area gets covered by profuse growth of macrophytic vegetation of water hyacinth and Potamogeton species during summers.

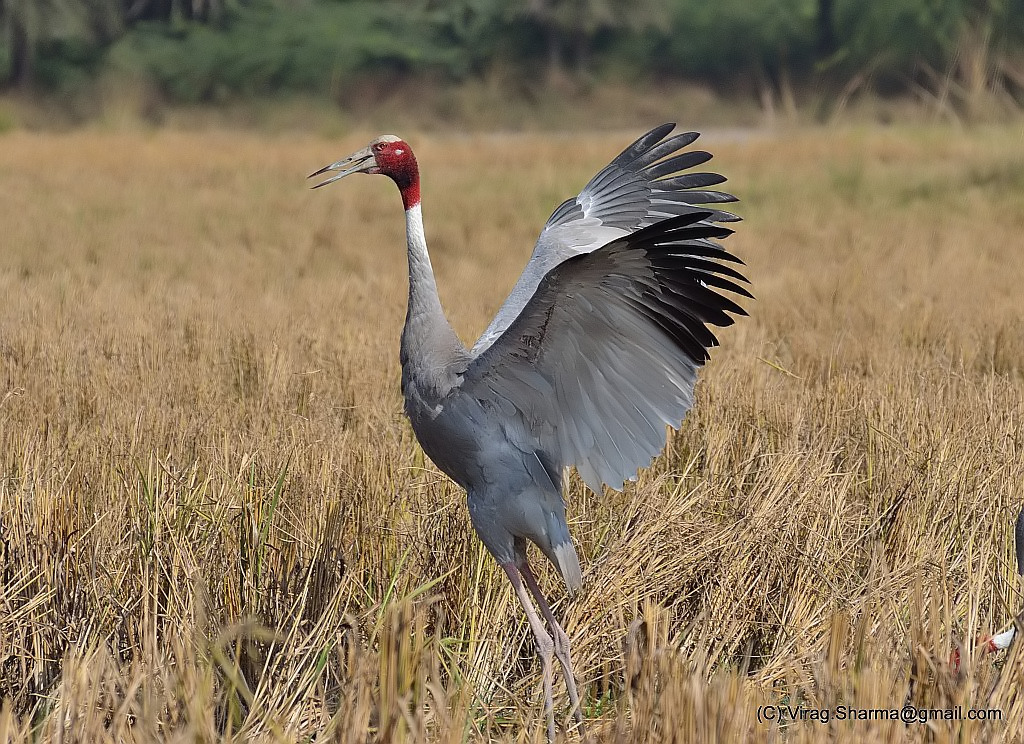
Sarus crane

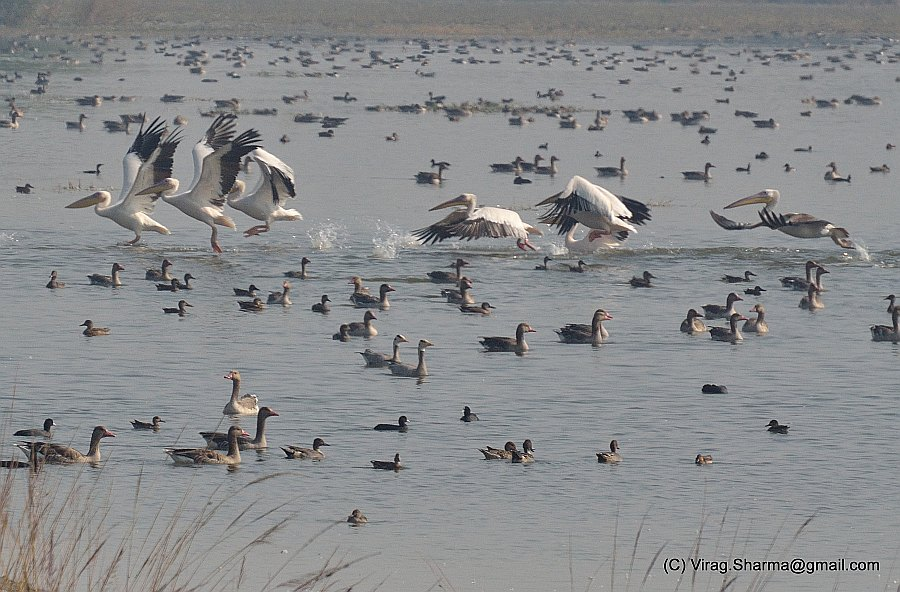
Rosy pelican, greylag goose, bar-headed goose

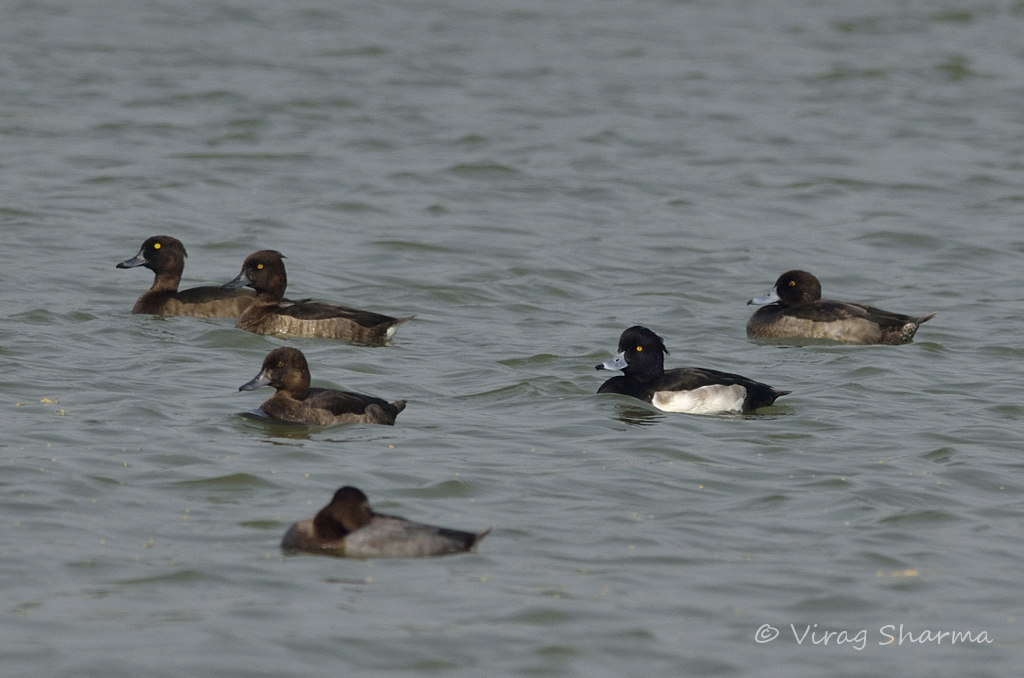
Tuffed duck and Fargusion ducks

About 200,000 birds of 300 different bird species frequent the sanctuary. More than 106 species of migratory and resident birds are known to have their resting habitats around the lake. The important aquatic birds inhabiting lake are:

- Lesser whistling-duck
- Graylag goose
- Comb duck
- Ruddy shelduck
- Gadwall
- Eurasian wigeon
- Indian spot-billed duck
- Northern shoveler
- Northern pintail
- Green-winged teal
- Common pochard
- Ferruginous duck
- Baer's pochard
- Tufted duck
- Indian peafowl
- Common quail
- Black francolin
- Gray francolin
- Little grebe
- Asian openbill
- Woolly-necked stork
- Black-necked stork
- Little cormorant
- Great cormorant
- Purple heron
- Cattle egret
- Indian pond-heron
- Black-headed ibis
- Red-naped ibis
- Eurasian spoonbill
- Black-shouldered kite
- Egyptian vulture
- Booted eagle
- Bonelli's eagle
- Shikra
- Black kite
- Eurasian coot
- Sarus crane
- Black-winged stilt
- Black-tailed godwit
- Laughing dove
- Greater coucal
- Rose-ringed parakeet
- Plum-headed parakeet
- Long-tailed shrike
- Black drongo
- Rufous treepie
- Ashy-crowned sparrow-lark
- Bengal bushlark
- Red-vented bulbul
- Plain leaf warbler
- Ashy prinia
- Plain prinia
- Common babbler
- Oriental magpie-robin
- Brahminy starling
- Common myna
- Bank myna
- Purple sunbird
- Indian silverbill
- Scaly-breasted munia

== See also ==
- Shekha Jheel
- Keetham Lake
