= Wildlife SOS =

Animal rescue organization in India

- Formation: 1995; 31 years ago
- Founder: Geeta Seshamani, Kartick Satyanarayan
- Headquarters: New Delhi
- Website: wildlifesos.org

Wildlife SOS (WSOS) is a conservation non-profit organisation in India, established in 1995 with the primary objective of rescuing and rehabilitating wildlife in distress, and preserving India's natural heritage. It is one of the largest wildlife organisations in South Asia.

WSOS worked to end the cruel and barbaric practice of dancing bears from the streets of India, while creating alternative livelihoods for the nomadic communities that depended on the exploitation of the bears. It also rehabilitates sloth bears and more recently elephants. Wildlife SOS also runs projects focused on mitigation of human wildlife conflict with regard to species like leopards, macaques, elephants, moon bears, snakes, and other animals across several states in India. In addition, their work includes projects targeted at biodiversity and habitat conservation, awareness workshops and anti-poaching operations, as well as the rehabilitation of communities dependent on performing or working animals for their livelihood.

Wild life SOS features in a documentary show series of History TV called India's Jungle Heroes.

== History ==
Wildlife SOS was founded in 1995 by Kartick Satyanarayan and Geeta Seshamani with the motive of protecting and preserving India's natural heritage, forests, and wildlife. Initially dedicated to resolving the centuries-old practice of 'dancing' bears, the organisation now runs several projects across the country focused on rescuing wildlife in distress, mitigating human-animal conflict, habitat restoration, raising awareness, training enforcement officers, conducting scientific research, and conservation studies, combating illegal wildlife trade and trafficking and rehabilitating wildlife-dependent communities.

In 2005, as Wildlife SOS co-founders Kartick Satyanarayan and Geeta Seshamani visited the United States for fundraising and awareness engagements.

In 2009, Wildlife SOS UK was launched as a 501(c)3 charity organization in support of the conservation work taking place in India. Wildlife SOS UK works in collaboration with the volunteers and staff in India to raise awareness and funds for their various ongoing projects.

== Mission ==
Wildlife SOS aims to protect and preserve India's wildlife, run rehabilitation and rescue centres for wildlife, conserve habitats, raise awareness, conduct research, study biodiversity and provide sustainable alternative livelihoods for communities otherwise dependent on wildlife to earn a livelihood.

The organisation is undertaking several conservation projects: Dancing Bear Project, Elephant Conservation and Care, Leopard Conservation, Tribal Rehabilitation Program, Human-Bear Conflict Mitigation, Human-Wildlife Conflict Mitigation, Anti-Poaching, Human-Elephant Conflict Mitigation, Habitat Conservation, Research and Conservation, and Training and Awareness. Wildlife SOS takes a comprehensive approach to saving India's wildlife through conservation.

=== Animal welfare ===
Wildlife SOS works to protect India's wildlife, provides care for animals who cannot return to the wild and medical treatment for animals that can be released, offers rescue services for captive and abused animals, and advocates to prevent animals from being exploited for entertainment. The organisation is equipped with rescue and medical teams, a dedicated elephant ambulance, 12 sanctuaries, and a unit for treating elephants and advanced studies to improve care.

=== Research ===
Wildlife SOS uses technology like drones and camera traps to study elephants, leopards, sloth bears, and other animals in their native habitat. It also conducts animal care studies at its rescue facilities and gathers information to better understand all of India's sensitive and threatened species. WSOS works with partners around the world to learn more about protecting and caring for the species most endangered. Wildlife SOS also works with local communities through outreach programs and workshops to reduce or resolve human-wildlife conflicts.

=== Community empowerment ===
Wildlife SOS works towards empowering local communities like the Kalandar community, which earlier relied on bear dancing for their livelihoods. It imparts education to the children of the Kalandar community and provides opportunities for the members to financially sustain themselves with alternative livelihoods. Moreover, WSOS also provides training to those residing close to human-wildlife conflict zones.

== Projects ==
=== Sloth bears ===
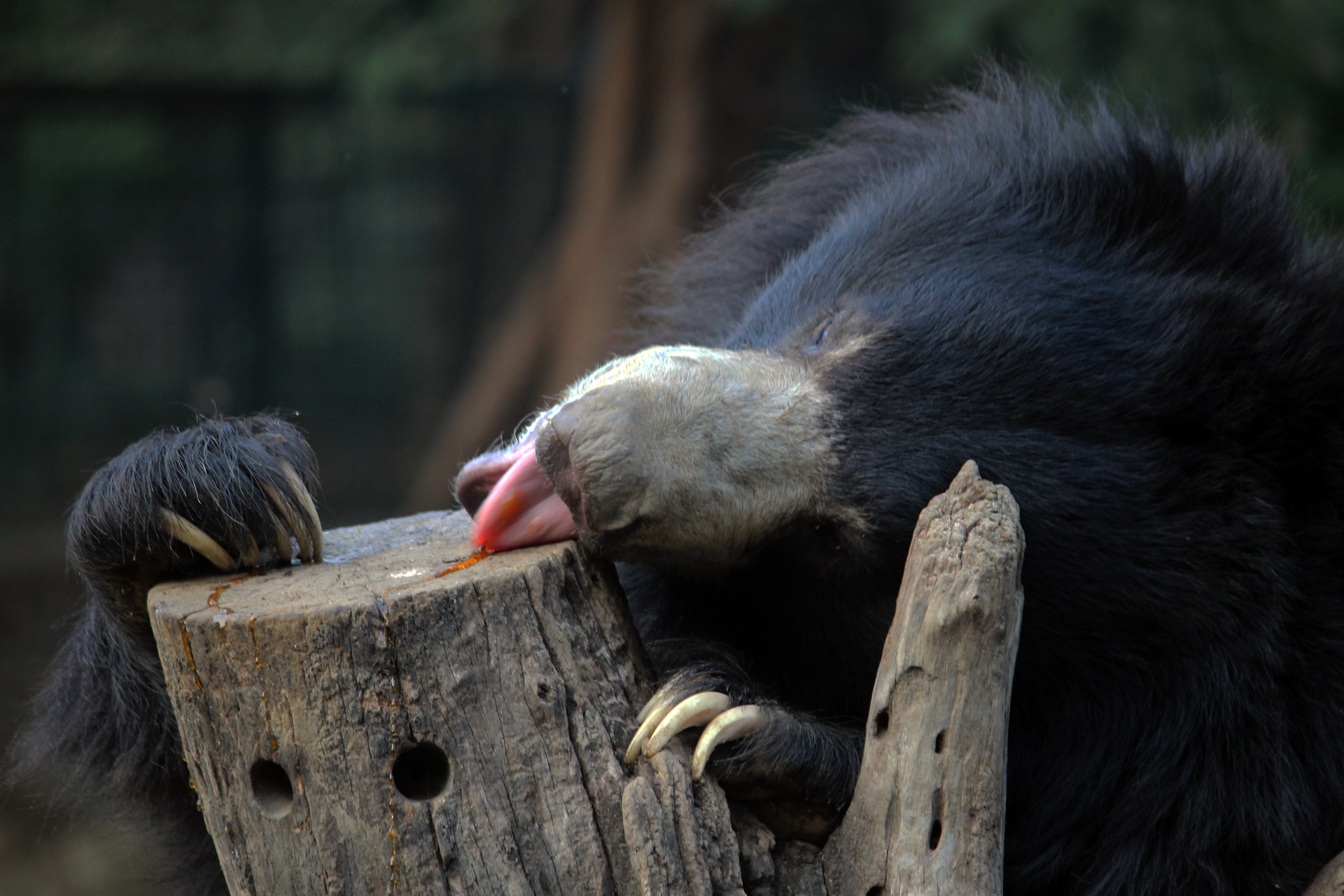
A Rescued Sloth Bear at the Agra Bear Rescue Facility

The Sloth bear (Melurus ursinus) is a medium-sized omnivorous species of bear found in the Indian subcontinent, predominantly India, with a small population in Nepal and Bhutan and a sub-species in Sri Lanka. This species is listed as Vulnerable on the IUCN Red List.

One of the major threats to these bears has been the exploitation of sloth bears as ‘dancing’ bears by members of a nomadic tribe known as the Kalandars or Qalandars (a trade declared illegal under the Wildlife Protection Act 1972). Today, poaching and trafficking of live bears and their body parts for use in traditional Chinese medicine, increasing human-wildlife conflict, habitat fragmentation and deforestation have led to the declining numbers of sloth bears in the wild.

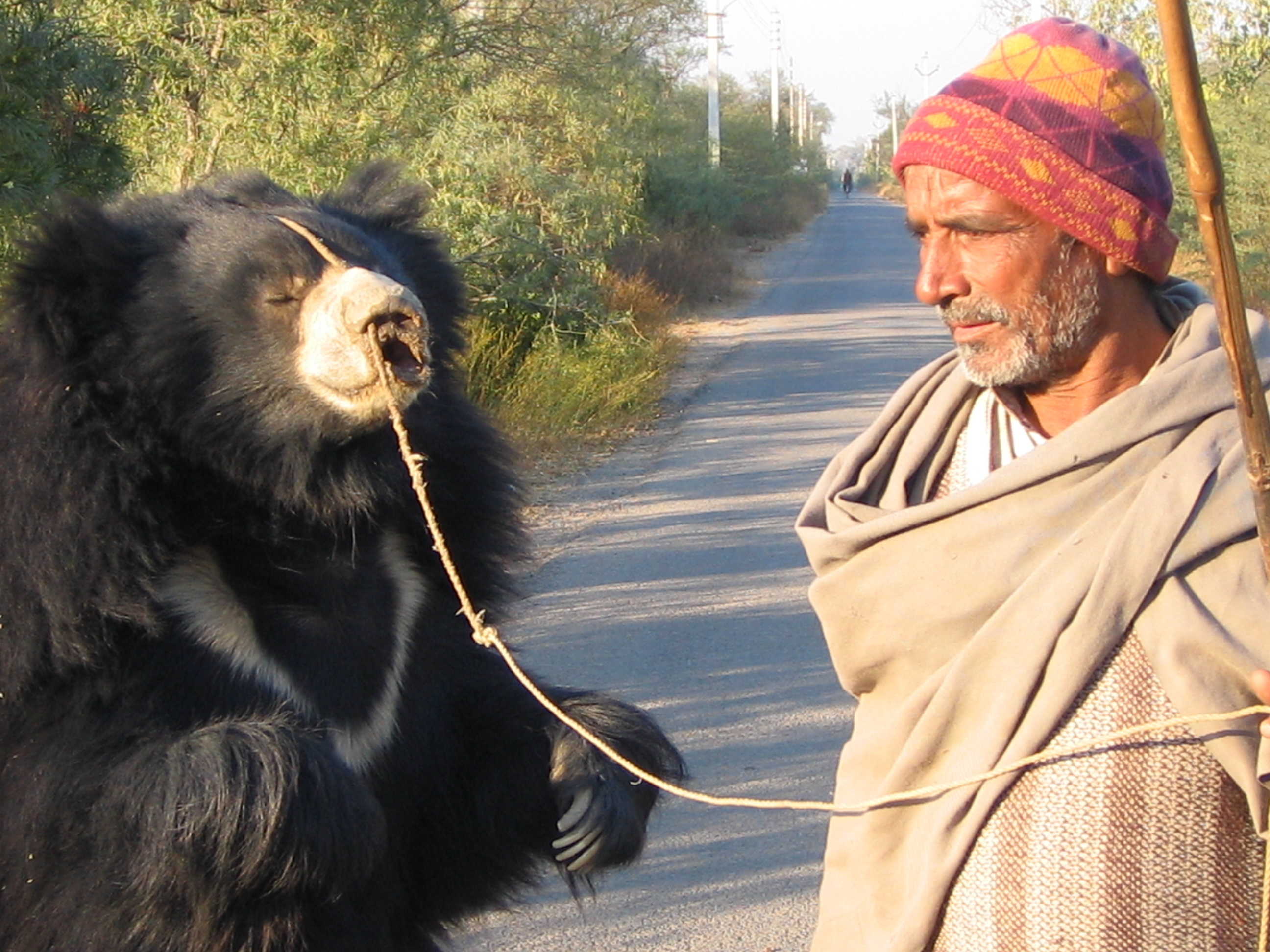
A dancing bear and its Kalandar Master

Wildlife SOS is credited with rescuing bears from the ‘dancing bear’ practices and poachers and rehabilitating them in one of four centres in India.

1. Agra Bear Rescue Facility (2000) in Agra
2. Bannerghatta Bear Rescue Facility (2005) in Karnataka
3. Van Vihar Bear Rescue Facility (2006) in Bhopal
4. Purulia Bear Rescue Centre (2007) in West Bengal

Here, the bears are provided medical care, a nutritious diet, and have the chance to socialize and roam in large, free-range areas. To date, more than 650 sloth bears have been rehabilitated by the organization. Wildlife SOS also carries out ex-situ conservation studies on the bears to enhance existing conservation measures for the species’ survival and provides sustainable, alternative livelihoods to the bears’ former owners and their families.

=== Elephants ===
The Indian elephant (Elephas maximus indicus) is one type of three recognized subspecies of the Asian elephant, native to mainland Asia and is listed as Endangered on the IUCN Red List.

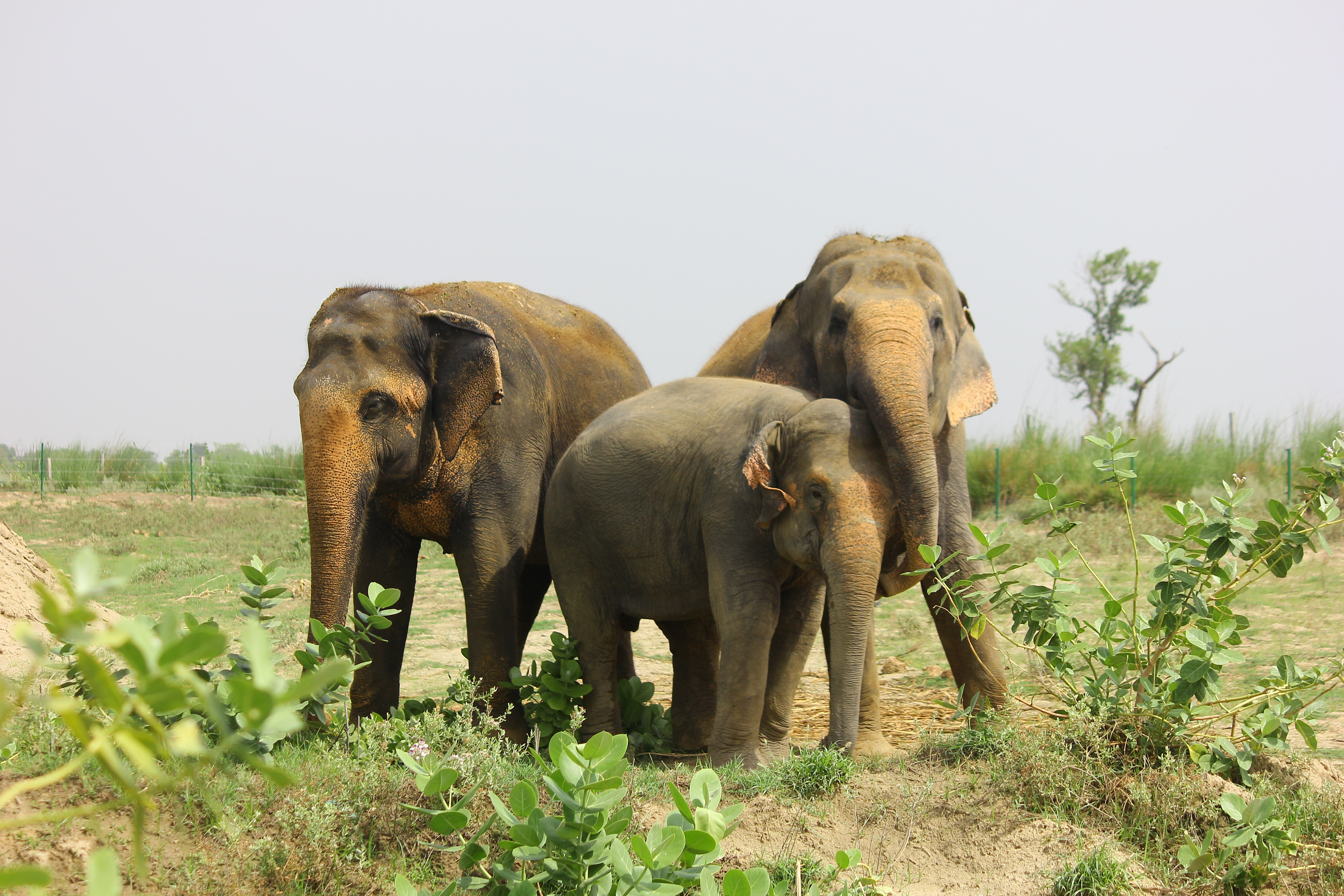
Rescued elephants at the Elephant Conservation and Care Centre, Mathura

Elephants are under threat due to poaching, habitat destruction, man-animal conflict, and encroachment etc. Ignorance and a lack of awareness have resulted in the continuous enslavement of these animals as working elephants - to beg, for display in temples, for performances and entertainment.

Wildlife SOS works in collaboration with the Government of India's Project Elephant and in partnership with the Haryana Forest Department at Ban Santour and the Uttar Pradesh Forest Department at Mathura to confiscate abused and mistreated elephants and provide them safe and healthy retirement in one of the three elephant sanctuaries it manages - the Elephant Conservation and Care Centre (set up in 2011) in Mathura, the Elephant Rescue Centre (set up in 2010) in Haryana, and a Treatment Unit (set up in 2018) in Agra.

Wildlife SOS is caring for 36 rehabilitated elephants at these centers. Medical treatment is made available for injured or sick elephants, and handlers, known as mahouts, are trained to carry out humane treatment and management of the animals to improve their working conditions and reduce illicit poaching and mistreatment of the animals.

The main objectives of these centres are to eradicate illegal trafficking and holding of elephants, create a platform for public awareness about the threats faced by Asian elephants, and ensure the safety and protection of elephants in the wild. As a first in India, a humane, modern, and scientific model has been implemented by Wildlife SOS to manage elephants in order to replace prevailing methods involving abuse and starvation of elephants, and risks to owners and mahouts.

Wildlife SOS veterinarians and trained staff work round the clock to cater to the needs of rescued and rehabilitated Asian elephants. Wildlife SOS has constructed a Treatment Unit in Churmura, Uttar Pradesh, designed to treat injured, sick or geriatric elephants. The Unit is equipped with an inbuilt path lab to test and diagnose elephants for a host of diseases and pathogens and hoist and support structure to deal with emergencies. To avoid spread of diseases, the Treatment Unit quarantines the ailing elephant for the required duration.

The Treatment Unit also has an interpretation centre and observation window for visiting veterinarians, biologists, and elephant caretakers from around the world to observe and learn about veterinary care for captive Asian elephants. The Unit has modern medical facilities for the treatment of injured elephants in distress like Wireless Digital X-Ray, Laser Treatment, Dental X-Ray, Thermal imaging, Hydrotherapy, Tranquilization Equipment, and Quarantine facilities. The Unit is located near Agra, in the Farah block of Mathura near the Elephant Conservation and Care Center (ECCC) run by Wildlife SOS.

=== 'Refuse To Ride' campaign ===
Poaching for use in captivity is a serious threat faced by elephants across South and Southeast Asian countries. They are forced to beg on the streets, give rides to tourists, made to perform unnatural tricks in circuses, and kept shackled in temples. The rich cultural and natural heritage of these countries attracts a substantial footfall of tourists every year. For many tourists travelling to India, taking an elephant ride tops their bucket list of must-have experiences. But most people are not aware of the harsh reality behind how elephants have been tamed and the horrific abuse they must endure being "trained" for giving rides.

To combat this cruel industry and educate people about elephant riding, Wildlife SOS launched a campaign called Refuse to Ride, in 2018, with the hope that the RTR campaign will educate the public and help bring a change for elephants all around the country.

=== Chhattisgarh wild elephant radio collaring project ===
The Mahasamund area of Chhattisgarh has been in the throes of human-elephant conflict ever since a herd of 19 wild elephants moved into the region after they were possibly displaced from the shrinking forests of Odisha or Jharkhand. Regular instances of crop-raiding and destruction of human habitations are the reason for the escalation of the conflict. When the Chhattisgarh Forest Department took the initiative to minimize the rapidly growing Human-Elephant Conflict, Wildlife SOS came up with a unique plan to use radio collars on the wild elephant herd so as to issue timely alerts to the villages, by effectively tracking the elephants’ movements.

The radio-collaring program has been successful in raising awareness and involving local communities as stakeholders to effectively mitigate human-elephant conflict situations. The radio collar tracks the location of the matriarch of the herd so we can monitor whether or not she is approaching human settlement areas. Predicting the matriarch's location helps in assessing her possible route, which helps in reaching out to local community representatives to raise alerts in the village. This has led to the mitigation of conflict in areas that are prone to human-elephant encounters. Interactive discussions on the biology, behaviour, and ecology of wild elephants and the safety measures that can be adopted to avoid conflicts were conducted in awareness workshops. These sessions also educate the villagers about the reasons for such conflict, elephant behaviour, essential conflict mitigation strategies, and the importance of Early Warning Systems (EWS). In fact, through these sessions, volunteers actively help in alerting the villages when the elephants are nearby, thereby making communication during the time of distress more efficient and reliable.

=== Black bears ===
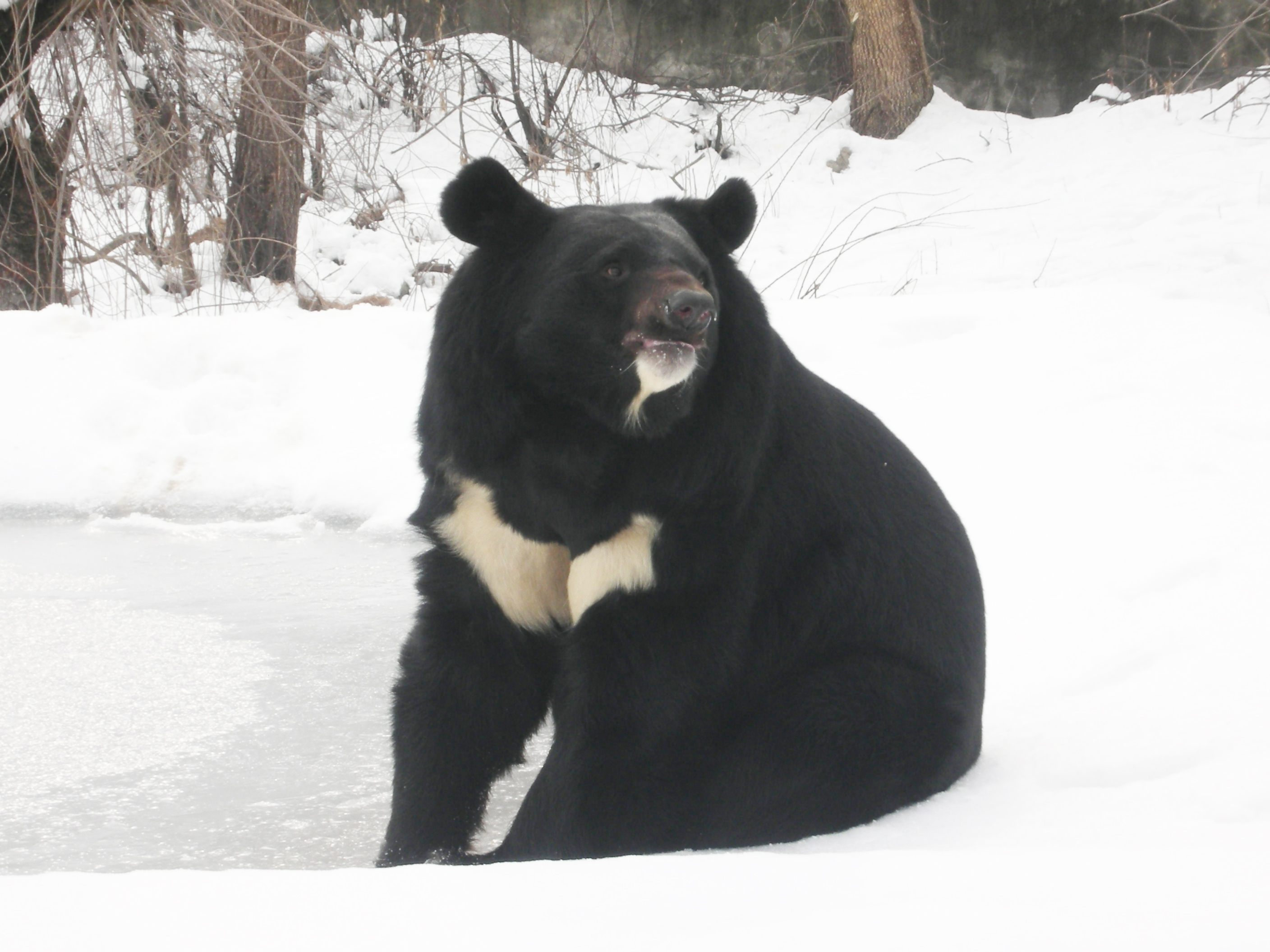
Rescued Asiatic Black Bear at the Dachigam Bear Rescue Centre

The Asiatic black bear (Ursus thibetanus), also called the Moon bear, is one of four species of bear found in India. The range of the Asiatic black bear extends across the Himalayas, from Bhutan to Pakistan. It is listed as Vulnerable on the IUCN Red list.

Wildlife SOS works in Kashmir to mitigate human-animal conflict that arises when bears wander into human settlements, incidents of which increase with deforestation and encroachment. Wildlife SOS has been working with the Jammu and Kashmir Wildlife Protection Department and the Forest Department since 2007, attempting to mitigate the conflict situation in the area.

As part of this project, known as the Moon Bear Conservation Project, Wildlife SOS conducts training workshops for the staff of the J&K Wildlife Protection Department with a focus on capacity building and training in the use of specialized tranquilizing equipment and avoidance behaviour, carries out extensive studies on man-animal conflict situations and treats and rehabilitates animals that fall victim to confrontation- in particular moon bears and leopards. If possible, the animals are released back into the wild, or else they are cared for and treated by Wildlife SOS staff at centers in Pahalgam and Dachigam in Kashmir.

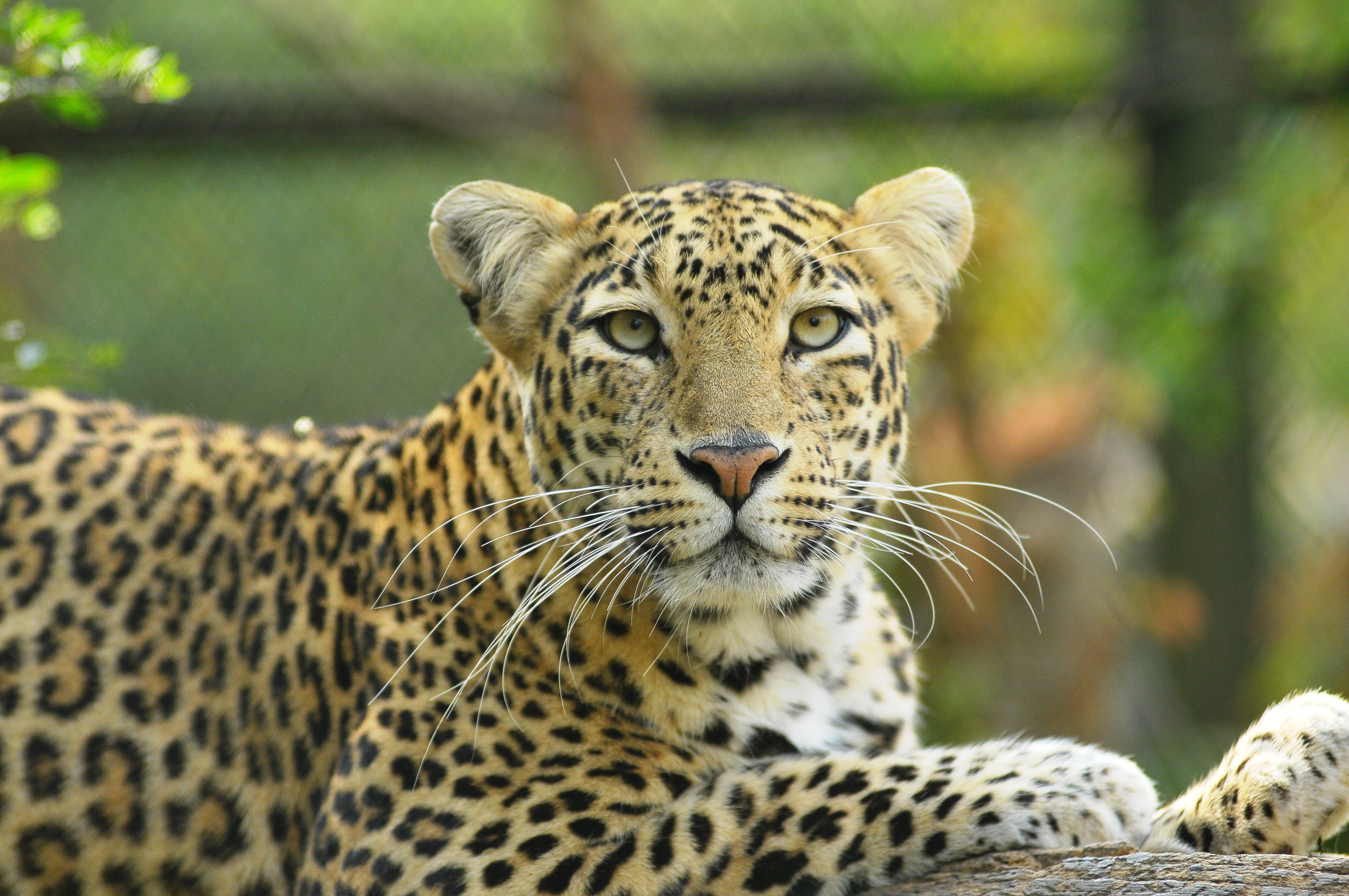
Rescued Leopard at the Wildlife SOS Manikdoh Leopard Rescue Centre

=== Leopards ===
The leopard (Panthera pardus) is one of five big cats found in India (also found in Nepal, Bangladesh, Bhutan, and Pakistan) and is listed as Near Threatened on the IUCN Red List.

The animals are under threat due to a variety of factors, including but not limited to habitat encroachment and poaching.

The scrub jungle of Maharashtra was ideal habitat for the leopard until incentives for the cultivation of sugarcane lead to rampant callous farming practices and encroachment of the leopards’ habitat, causing man-animal conflict to escalate. In 2008, Wildlife SOS collaborated with the state government on the expansion of the existing Manikdoh Leopard Rescue Centre in Junnar, near Pune, which currently houses 30 leopards. In addition, Wildlife SOS veterinarians and biologists conduct awareness workshops and training programs for local communities, the Forest Department, law enforcement, educational institutions, and forums to help raise awareness and mitigate conflict situations.

=== Ramdurga habitat conservation ===
Wildlife SOS’ habitat conservation project is situated near the Ram Durga valley in Koppal, Karnataka, and aims at protecting critical sloth bear habitat, threatened by illegal mining activities, rampant deforestation, and encroachment by human settlements and industries which, along with poaching, massacred the wildlife of the region. In 2007, Wildlife SOS purchased nearly 40 acres (16 ha) of land in the region, creating a crucial wildlife corridor by allowing at-risk habitats to link up with a patch of Reserve Forest.

The project was expanded in 2012, with the acquisition of an additional 10 acres (4.0 ha) of land, made possible by the support of BHEL, PSSR, Chennai. In consultation with experts, appropriate species of vegetation were selected and an extensive afforestation project was undertaken- planting nearly 10,000 saplings. A bore well, drip irrigation system, and solar-powered electrical fencing were soon acquired. Local community members were employed to manage and patrol the land, allowing the project to achieve a 90% plant survival rate in just 2–3 years. The vegetation flourished and, in areas where conservation efforts had been initiated earlier, species of wildlife have begun returning, including sloth bears, leopards, and endangered species like the pangolin and star tortoise.

In addition, Wildlife SOS works with local communities and stakeholders and educates them so as to increase their involvement in forest protection. The organization works to secure agricultural land along the forested areas, to serve as safe buffers for wildlife.

=== Anti-poaching ===
Wildlife SOS works to curb the illegal trade and trafficking of wildlife and wildlife products - birds, mammals, and reptiles, along with skins, bones, and other body parts harvested from poached animals. Efforts at eradicating the practice of ‘dancing’ bears and related poaching have resulted in a marked reduction in bear poaching as per statistics.

Wildlife SOS’ anti-poaching squad, Forest Watch, consists of a complex network of informants gathering critical information on poachers and criminals involved in the illegal wildlife trade. Forest Watch has assisted the forest department, the police department, and law enforcement agencies to crack down on traffickers and smugglers, recovering animal skins, body parts, ivory, and sometimes live animals from poachers, and even providing legal assistance where required.

Wildlife SOS offers further assistance by conducting grassroots-level training workshops focusing on capacity building and wildlife crime prevention in the field.

=== Conservation awareness ===
Understanding that human involvement is crucial to conservation efforts, Wildlife SOS works with local communities in urban and rural areas to educate people regarding their local wildlife and ecosystem. Programs focus on teaching locals how to live sustainably with their environment, helping people deal with man-animal conflict in vulnerable areas, and involving locals in conservation efforts such as tree plantation drives in Jammu and Kashmir, plastic removal drives in Bannerghatta, Karnataka, and cleaning the Dal Lake with the help of students from local schools and colleges.

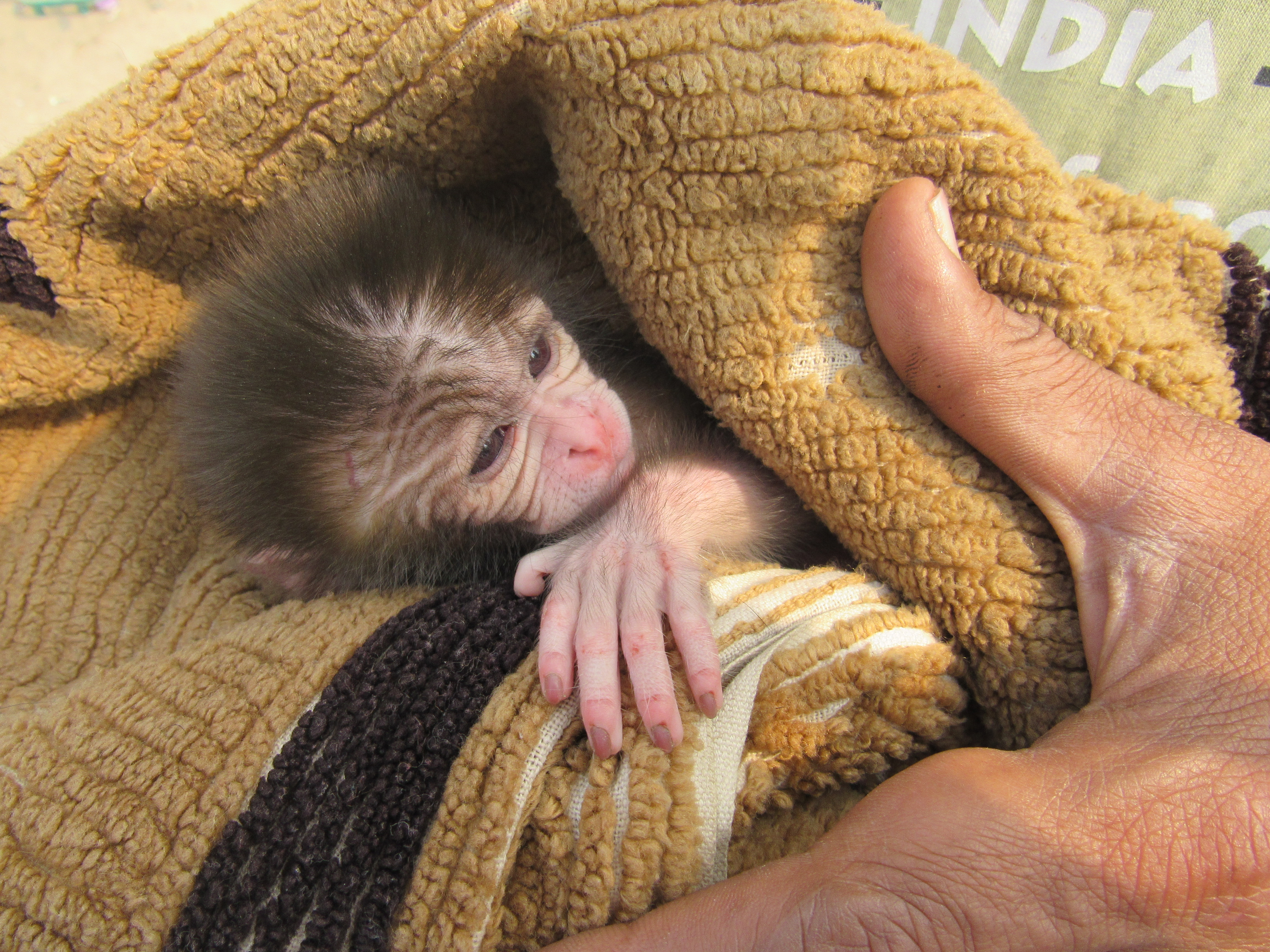
Orphaned rhesus macaque rescued by Wildlife SOS

Wildlife SOS also routinely hosts workshops with law officers, forest department enforcement officers, police, and customs officials to educate them about the wildlife trade, recognition of contraband, a basic understanding of related law in the field, conflict mitigation, and rescue techniques to control human-animal conflict.

=== Rescue helplines ===
In addition to its conservation projects, Wildlife SOS runs a 24-hour animal rescue with a team trained to perform emergency rescues of wild animals in four states – Delhi NCR, Uttar Pradesh, Gujarat, and Jammu and Kashmir. The initiative was started in 1998 and now responds to nearly 500 rescue calls a month. The team rescues animals that have been injured, abandoned, or trapped in urban areas. Common rescues include monkeys, jackals, snakes, monitor lizards, deer, and birds. These are given immediate medical attention and then released to suitable, safer locations. If the release is not possible, the animals are relocated to the WSOS Rescue Centre in Gurgaon, which was set up in 1999.

Since 2010, Wildlife SOS has been working in collaboration with the Gujarat Society for Prevention of Cruelty to Animals (GSPCA) to rescue wildlife trapped in urban localities, particularly snakes and crocodiles in Gujarat. Wildlife SOS's rescue team has animal-control contracts with Indira Gandhi Airport, Delhi Golf Club, Agra Development Authority, Delhi Jal Board, Akbar's Tomb, residential colonies in the city, and the Commonwealth Games village for the 2010 Commonwealth games hosted in India.

=== Tribal rehabilitation program ===
As part of its project to eradicate the erstwhile practice of dancing bears in India, Wildlife SOS runs a simultaneous rehabilitation program for the Qalandar (Kalandar) tribals, for whom the bears provided a source of livelihood. The program, started in 2001, includes incentives for the bear-owners, in the form of sustainable livelihood alternatives. Wildlife SOS may provide seed funds for ventures or assist in the purchase of shops, handcarts, bicycles, cycle-rickshaws, auto-rickshaws, or something that could support an alternative career for the individual, as well as providing training for alternative jobs as drivers, small scale poultry or goat farmers, metallurgy or gem-cutting and stone polishing for costume jewelry. Rehabilitated tribals form nearly 50% of the workforce at Wildlife SOS rescue centres.

Wildlife SOS also organizes vocational courses and seed funding for the womenfolk of the community to start businesses in the states of Rajasthan, Madhya Pradesh, Uttar Pradesh, and Haryana, sets up self-help groups, and provides them with marketing links, wherever necessary. This allows them to become secondary breadwinners for the family and empowers them through financial independence.

Further, Wildlife SOS provides educational opportunities for the children of Kalandars, helping them break out of the cycle of poverty and oppression and resolving the dependency on ‘dancing’ bears for income, thereby reducing poaching and mistreatment of the animals.

Wildlife SOS is also involved in the rehabilitation of other traditionally wildlife-dependent communities including the Saperas, an originally nomadic, Muslim tribe of snake-charmers, hiring the community members to work with them as animal rescue workers.

=== Star tortoise repatriation project ===
Wildlife SOS released over 51 Indian star tortoises as a part of the Wildlife SOS Indian Star Tortoise Repatriation Project. These tortoises, along with over 100 others, were confiscated in Singapore, luckily before they were put on the black market to be sold as pets or food. Wildlife SOS worked with ACRES (Animal Concerns Research and Education Society), a non-profit group based in Singapore and CITES, and the Central Government & Forest Department of Karnataka to get the tortoises back to India. Once back in India, they were placed in soft release enclosures next to the Wildlife SOS field station in Ramdurga Reserve Forest in the southern state of Karnataka, where they could reacclimate to their native conditions before being released back to the wild.

This is the first time that a unique and innovative satellite telemetry study of Indian Star tortoises rescued from the illegal wildlife trafficking industry has been initiated. A team of researchers and wildlife biologists monitor the movements and ranging patterns of the tortoises in the wild. The Satellite Tags attached to some of the tortoises indicate their movement pattern, pace, and location using satellite locations. As a part of the research study, factors like health condition, body weight, behaviour patterns, adaptation to wild foraging, etc. are also being documented. The Satellite tags combined with radio transmitters are attached to the carapace of the tortoises which is the dorsal portion of its shell). This will enable the research team to track and monitor the movements and ranging patterns of the tortoises.

=== 'The Wild Side' with Wildlife SOS! ===
"The Wild Side" with Wildlife SOS is an online talk show featuring Bollywood celebrities, philanthropists, conservationists, and wildlife filmmakers from across the globe to create awareness about wildlife and nature conservation. Hosted by the NGO's co-founder and CEO— Kartick Satyanarayan, the show shares good news, lessons from the lockdown, and thoughts on wildlife conservation amidst rapid-fire sessions.

The Wild Side features conversations with noted guests such as Jim Sarbh, Randeep Hooda, Farah Khan Kunder, Adil Hussain, philanthropist and entrepreneur Roshni Nadar, conservationist and actor Katie Cleary, and award-winning Wildlife filmmakers Sandesh Kadur and Shaaz Jung. The 30-minute segment is an informative and lively opportunity for viewers to learn about the challenges in wildlife and environmental conservation.

It was launched on the 5 June 2020 to commemorate World Environment Day.

=== Elephant Tails podcast ===
The Elephant Tails Podcast, produced by Wildlife SOS, features stories and behind-the-scenes accounts from people working to protect India’s wildlife. As of August 2026, the podcast has released seven episodes covering the organization’s work and the challenges its teams face.

From rescuing animals from myriad scenarios - elephants from abject negligence and abuse, leopards from open wells - to researching sloth bears and their denning habits via camera traps, the podcast aims to shed light on the work undertaken by Wildlife SOS in an effort to spread awareness.

== Publications and papers ==
Notable publications include:

- Geeta Seshamani, Kartick Stayanarayan; Dancing Bears of India (1997)
- Brij Kishor Gupta, R. Singh, Kartick Satyanarayan, Geeta Seshamani; Trade in Bears and Their Parts in India : Threats to Conservation of Bears (2006)
- Wildlife SOS; Gall Bladder in the State of Uttarakhand (2006)
- Usham Singh; Conservation and Science: Human-Leopard Conflict Study in Jammu and Kashmir, India (2008)
- Kartick Satyanarayan; Working with Government Agencies: Wildlife Crime Enforcement, Wildlife Rescue and Rehabilitation (2008)
- Dr. Arun A. Sha; Dental Diseases in Sloth Bears and Tigers and Their Treatment (2008)

Wildlife SOS has published numerous field reports and veterinary papers as well.
