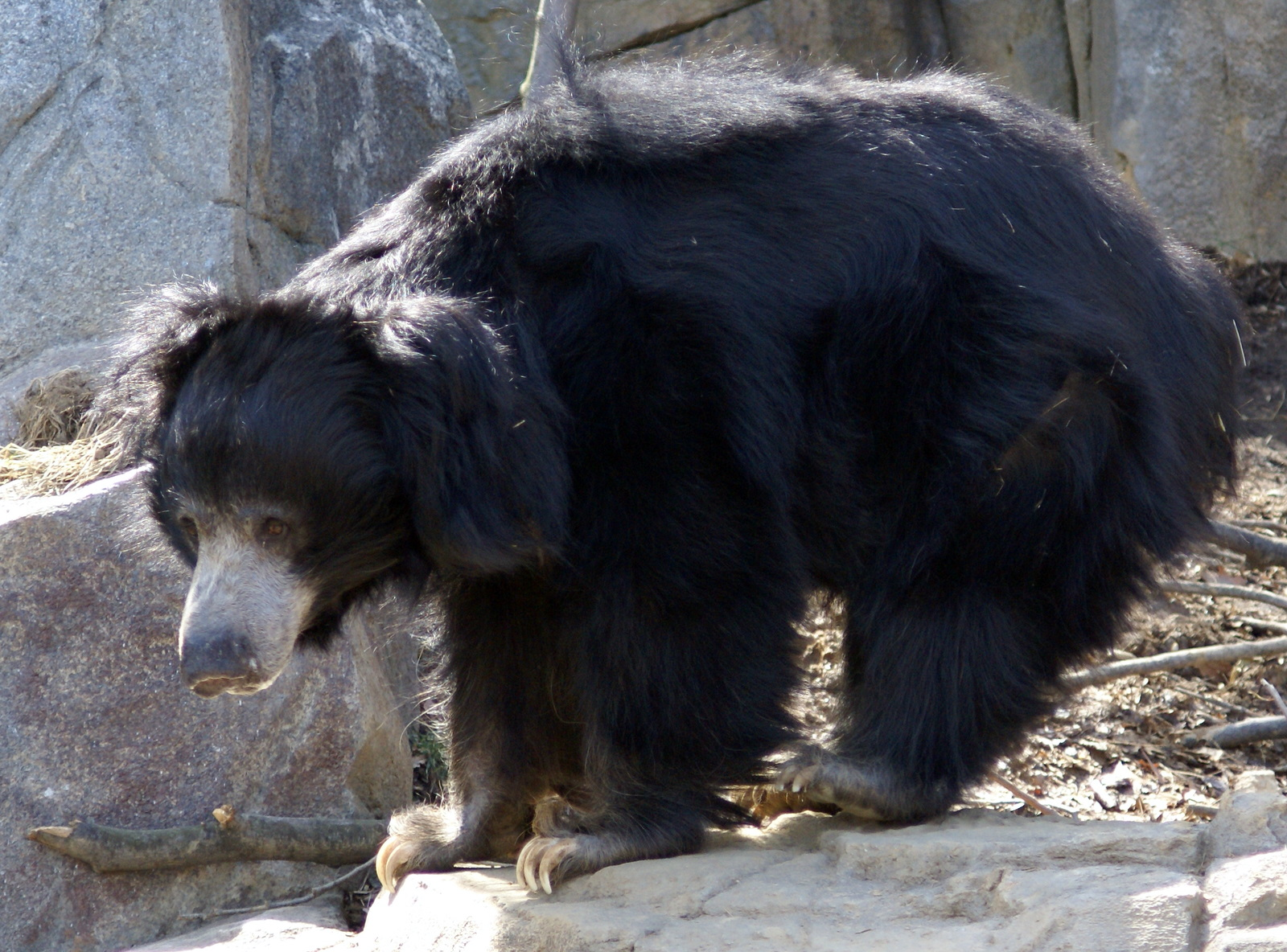
- Sloth bear in the Smithsonian National Zoological Park in Washington, D.C.

Conservation status
- Vulnerable (IUCN 3.1)
- CITES Appendix I

Scientific classification
- Kingdom: Animalia
- Phylum: Chordata
- Class: Mammalia
- Order: Carnivora
- Family: Ursidae
- Subfamily: Ursinae
- Genus: Melursus; Meyer, 1793
- Species: M. ursinus

Binomial name
- Melursus ursinus (Shaw, 1791)
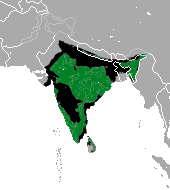
- Sloth bear range (black – former, green – extant)

Synonyms
- Bradypus ursinus Shaw, 1791; Melursus lybius Meyer, 1793

= Sloth bear =

Sloth bear Temporal range: Late Pliocene to Early Pleistocene – recent

Species of bear

The sloth bear (Melursus ursinus), also known as the Indian bear, is a myrmecophagous bear species native to the Indian subcontinent. It feeds on fruits, ants and termites. It is listed as vulnerable on the IUCN Red List, mainly because of habitat loss and degradation. It is the only species in the genus Melursus.

It has also been called "labiated bear" because of its long lower lip and palate used for sucking up insects. It has long, shaggy fur, a mane around the face, and long, sickle-shaped claws. It is lankier than brown and Asian black bears. It shares features of insectivorous mammals and evolved during the Pleistocene from the ancestral ursine bear through divergent evolution.

Sloth bears breed during spring and early summer and give birth near the beginning of winter. When their territories are encroached upon by humans, they sometimes attack them. Historically, humans have drastically reduced these bears' habitat and diminished their population by hunting them for food and products such as their bacula and claws. Sloth bears have been tamed and used as performing animals and as pets.

== Taxonomy ==
George Shaw in 1791 named the species Bradypus ursinus. In 1793, Meyer named it Melursus lybius, and in 1817, de Blainville named it Ursus labiatus because of its long lips. Illiger named it Prochilus hirsutus, the Greek genus name indicating long lips, while the specific name noted its long and coarse hair. Fischer called it Chondrorhynchus hirsutus, while Tiedemann named it Ursus longirostris.

=== Subspecies and range ===
Name	Description	Distribution
Indian sloth bear (M. u. ursinus) (Shaw, 1791)	This is the nominate subspecies and has a large skull with a condylobasal length of about 290 mm (11 in) in females and about 310 mm (12 in) in males.	The sloth bear is the most widespread bear species in India, where it mostly occurs in areas with forest cover, low hills bordering the outer range of the Himalayas from Punjab to Arunachal Pradesh. It is absent in the high mountains of Himachal Pradesh and Jammu and Kashmir, the northwestern deserts of Rajasthan, and a broad unforested swath in the south, where Mount Abu Wildlife Sanctuary is located. Sloth bear occurs in protected areas such as Shoolpaneshwar, Ratanmahal, Jessore, and Balaram Ambaji Sanctuaries. In Nepal, it is restricted to the Terai.
Sri Lankan sloth bear (M. u. inornatus) Pucheran, 1855	The Sri Lankan sloth bear is smaller than the nominate subspecies, has a smaller skull with a condylobasal length of about 250 mm (9.8 in) in females and about 264 mm (10.4 in) in males. It has much shorter body hair, and sometimes lacks the characteristic white chest mark.	At the turn of the century, the Sri Lankan sloth bear occurred throughout Sri Lanka. But due to wide-scale conversion of upland forests into tea and coffee plantations, it is now restricted to the northern and eastern lowlands.

== Evolution ==
Sloth bears may have reached their current form in the Early Pleistocene, the time when the bear family specialised and dispersed. A fragment of fossilised humerus from the Pleistocene, found in Andhra Pradesh's Kurnool Basin is identical to the humerus of a modern sloth bear. The fossilised skulls of a bear once named Melursus theobaldi found in the Shivaliks from the Early Pleistocene or Early Pliocene are thought by certain authors to represent an intermediate stage between sloth bears and ancestral brown bears. M. theobaldi itself had teeth intermediate in size between sloth bears and other bear species, though its palate was the same size as the former species, leading to the theory that it is the sloth bear's direct ancestor. Sloth bears probably arose during the Middle Pliocene and evolved in the Indian subcontinent. The sloth bear shows evidence of having undergone a convergent evolution similar to that of other ant-eating mammals.

The sloth bear is one of eight extant species in the bear family Ursidae and of six extant species in the subfamily Ursinae. One possible phylogeny is based on complete mitochondrial DNA sequences from Yu et al. (2007). The polar bear and the brown bear form a close grouping, while the relationships of the other species are not very well resolved.

- Ursidae
  - Giant panda (Ailuropoda melanoleuca)
  - - Spectacled bear (Tremarctos ornatus)
    - - Ursinae
        - Sloth bear (Melursus ursinus)
        - - - Sun bear (Helarctos malayanus)
            - - Asian black bear (Ursus thibetanus)
              - American black bear (Ursus americanus)
          - - Polar bear (Ursus maritimus)
            - Brown bear (Ursus arctos)

A more recent phylogeny is based on the genetic study of Kumar et al. (2017). It concludes that Ursine bears originated around five million years ago, with extensive hybridization among the different species.

- Ursidae
  - Giant panda (Ailuropoda melanoleuca)
  - - Spectacled bear (Tremarctos ornatus)
    - Ursinae
      - - - Sloth bear (Melursus ursinus)
          - Sun bear (Helarctos malayanus)
        - Asian black bear (Ursus thibetanus)
      - - American black bear (Ursus americanus)
        - - Polar bear (Ursus maritimus)
          - Brown bear (Ursus arctos)

== Characteristics ==
Skulls of a Sri Lankan sloth bear (left) and a common sloth bear (right) from the Muséum national d'histoire naturelle

Sloth bears adults are medium-sized bears. The typical weight range for females is from 55 to 105 kg (121 to 231 lb), and for males is from 80 to 145 kg (176 to 320 lb). Exceptionally large female specimens can reach 124 kg (273 lb) and males up to 192 kg (423 lb). The average weight of sloth bears from the nominate subspecies in Nepal was 95 kg (209 lb) in females and 114 kg (251 lb) in males. Nominate bears in India were found to weigh average 93.2 kg (205 lb) in males and 83.3 kg (184 lb) in female per one study. Specimens from Sri Lanka (M. u. inornatus) may weigh up to 68.2 kg (150 lb) in females and 104.5 kg (230 lb) in males. However six Sri Lankan male sloth bears averaged only 74.8 kg (165 lb), and 57.5 kg (127 lb) was the average for four females, so Sri Lankan bears could be around 30% lighter in body mass than nominate sloth bears and with more pronounced size sexual dimorphism. They are 60–92 cm (2 ft 0 in – 3 ft 0 in) high at the shoulder, and have a body length of 1.4–1.9 m (4 ft 7 in – 6 ft 3 in). Besides being smaller than males, females reportedly typically have more fur between their shoulders.

Sloth bear muzzles are thick and long, with small jaws and bulbous snouts with wide nostrils. They have long lower lips which can be stretched over the outer edge of their noses, and they lack upper incisors, thus allowing them to suck up large numbers of insects. The premolars and molars are smaller than in other bears, as they do not chew as much vegetation. In adults, the teeth are usually in poor condition, due to the amount of soil they suck up and chew when feeding on insects. The back of the palate is long and broad, as is typical in other ant-eating mammals. The paws are disproportionately large, and have highly developed, sickle-shaped, blunt claws which measure 10 cm (4 in) in length. Their toe pads are connected by a hairless web. They have the longest tail in the bear family, which can grow to 15–18 cm (6–7 in). Their back legs are not very strong, though they are knee-jointed, and allow them to assume almost any position. The ears are very large and floppy. The sloth bear is the only bear with long hair on its ears.

Sloth bear fur is completely black (rusty for some specimens), save for a whitish Y- or V-shaped mark on the chest. This feature is sometimes absent, particularly in Sri Lankan specimens. This feature, which is also present in Asian black bears and sun bears, is thought to serve as a threat display, as all three species are sympatric with tigers (tigers usually do not carry out attacks on an adult bear if the bear is aware or facing the cat). The coat is long, shaggy, and unkempt, despite the relatively warm environment in which the species is found, and is particularly heavy behind the neck and between the shoulders, forming a mane which can be 30 cm (12 in) long. The belly and underlegs can be almost bare. Sloth bears are usually about the same size as an Asian black bear but are immediately distinctive for their shaggier coat, whitish claws, as well as their typically rangier build. Their head and mouth is highly distinct from that of a black bear with a longer, narrower skull shape (particularly the snout), loose-looking, flappier lips and paler muzzle colour. In few areas of overlap, sloth bear confusion with sun bears is unlikely, given the latter species's considerably smaller size, much shorter fur, wrinkled folding skin (especially around the back), bolder chest marking and drastically different, more compact head structure and appearance.

== Distribution and habitat ==
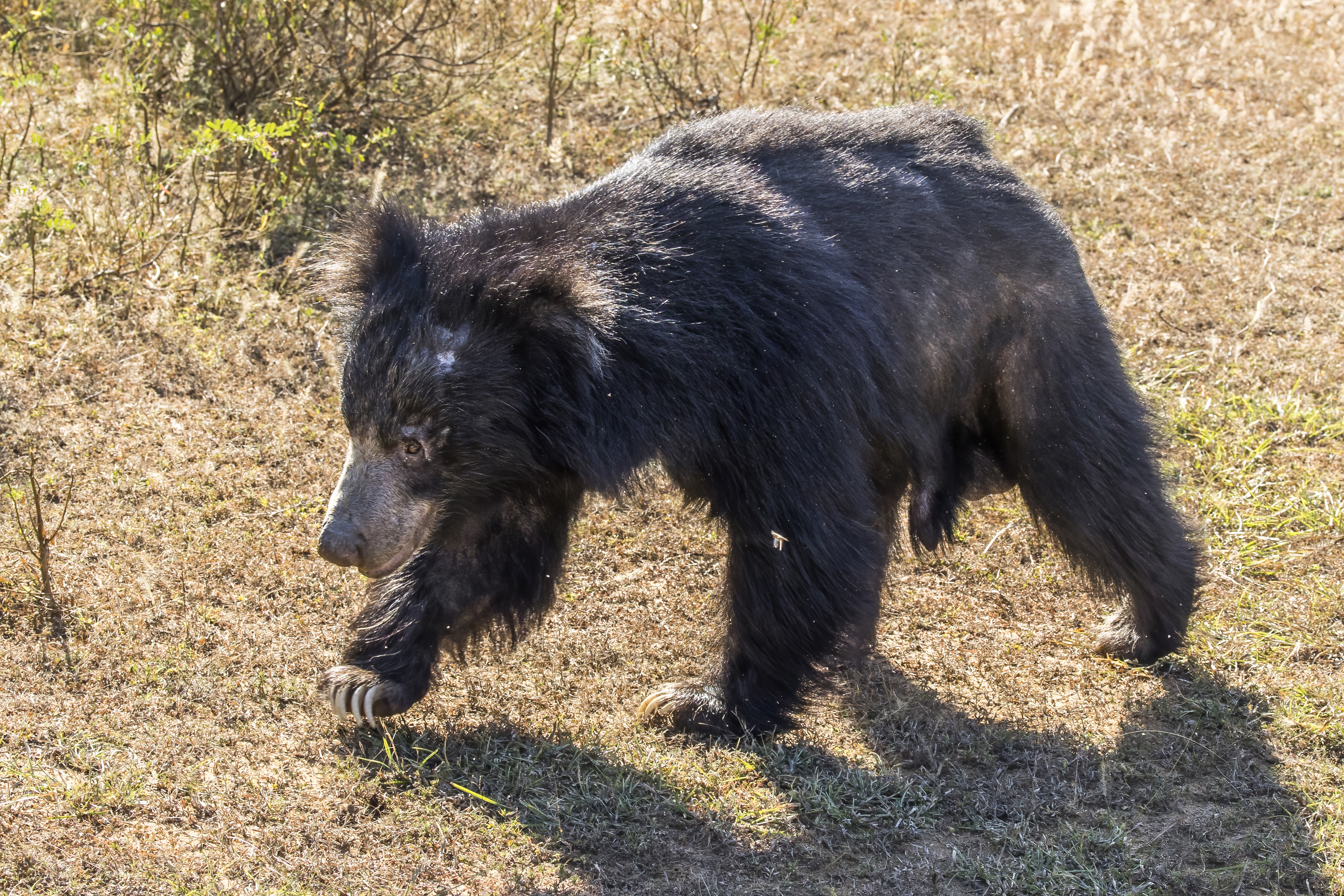
Male Sri Lankan sloth bear

The sloth bear's global range includes India, the Terai of Nepal, temperate climatic zones of Bhutan and Sri Lanka. It occurs in a wide range of habitats including moist and dry tropical forests, savannahs, scrublands and grasslands below 1,500 m (4,900 ft) on the Indian subcontinent, and below 300 m (980 ft) in Sri Lanka's dry forests. It is regionally extinct in Bangladesh.

== Behaviour and ecology ==
Adult sloth bears may travel in pairs. Males are often observed to be gentle with cubs. They may fight for food. They walk in a slow, shambling motion, with their feet being set down in a noisy, flapping motion. They are capable of galloping faster than running humans. Although they appear slow and clumsy, both young and adult sloth bears are excellent climbers. They occasionally will climb to feed and to rest, though not to escape enemies, as they prefer to stand their ground. Sloth bear mothers carry their cubs up trees as the primary defense against attacks by predators instead of sending them up trees. The cubs can be threatened by predators such as tigers, leopards, and other bears. They are adequate climbers on more accessible trees but cannot climb as quickly or on as varied surfaces as can black bears due to the sloth species' more elongated claw structure. Given their smaller size and still shorter claws, sloth bear cubs probably climb more proficiently than adults (much as brown bear cubs can climb well but not adults). They are good swimmers, and primarily enter water to play.

To mark their territories, sloth bears scrape trees with their forepaws, and rub against them with their flanks. Sloth bears are recorded to produce several sounds and vocals. Howls, squeals, screams, barks and trumpet-like calls are made during aggressive encounters while huffing is made as a warning signal. Chuffing calls are made when disturbed. Females keep in contact with their cubs with a grunt-whicker while cubs yelp when separated.

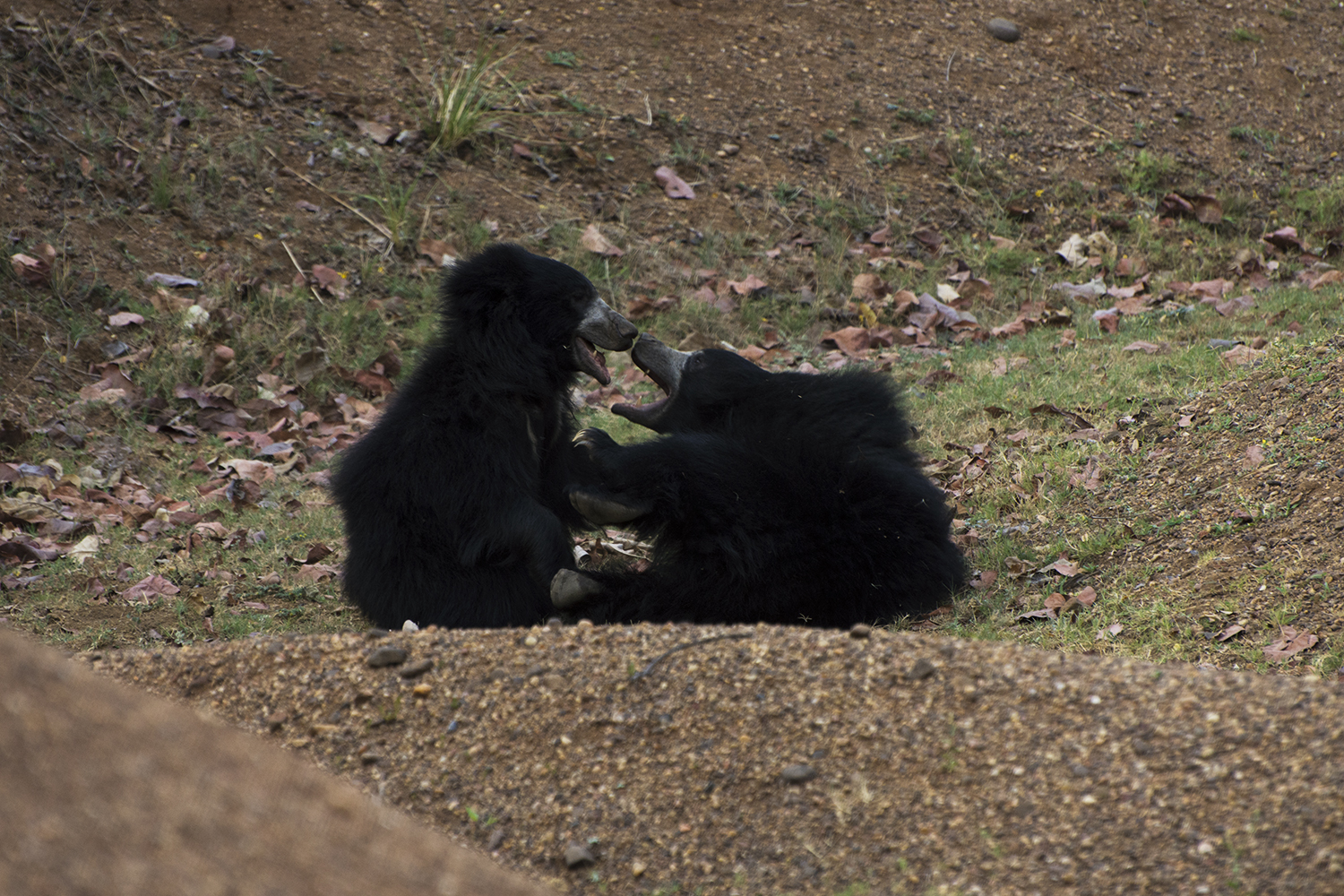
Sloth bears playing

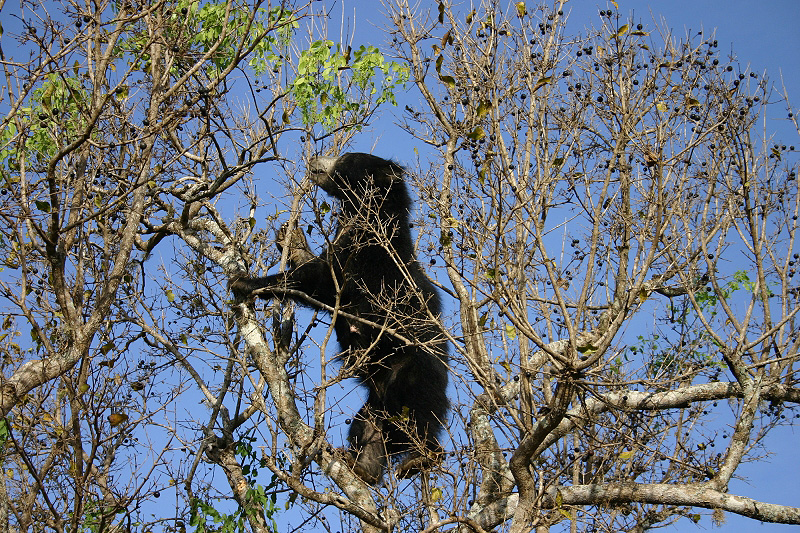
A Sri Lankan bear in a tree

=== Reproduction ===
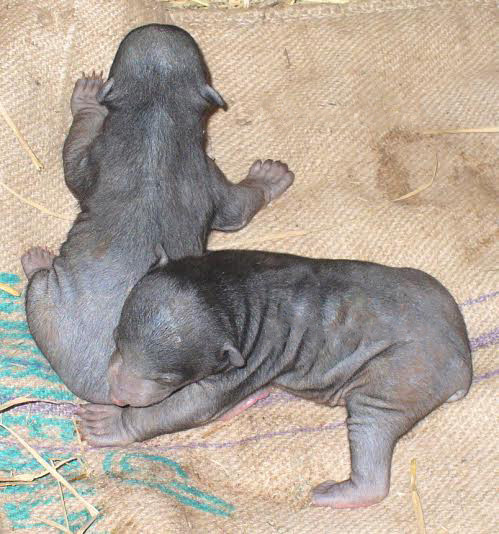
Seven-day-old bear cubs, rescued from a building site where they had been born

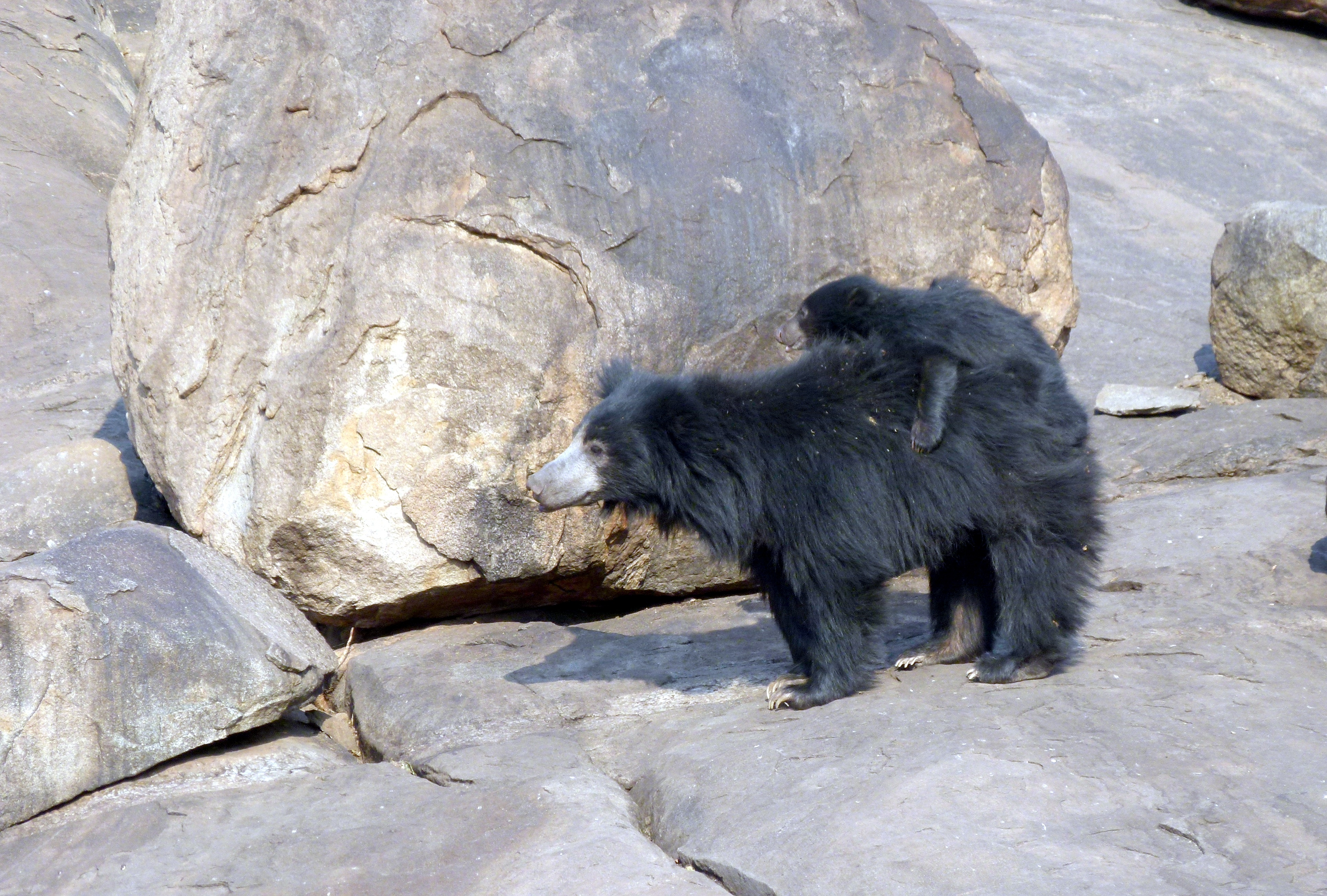
A mother with a cub on her back at the Daroji Sloth Bear Sanctuary, India

The breeding season for sloth bears varies according to location: in India, they mate in April, May, and June, and give birth in December and early January, while in Sri Lanka, it occurs all year. Sows gestate for 210 days, and typically give birth in caves or in shelters under boulders. Litters usually consist of one or two cubs, or rarely three. Cubs are born blind, and open their eyes after four weeks. Sloth bear cubs develop quickly compared to most other bear species: they start walking a month after birth, become independent at 24–36 months, and become sexually mature at the age of three years. Young cubs ride on their mother's back when she walks, runs, or climbs trees until they reach a third of her size. Individual riding positions are maintained by cubs through fighting. Intervals between litters can last two to three years.

=== Dietary habits ===
Sloth bears are expert hunters of termites, ants, and bees, which they locate by smell. On arriving at a mound, they scrape at the structure with their claws until they reach the large combs at the bottom of the galleries, and disperse the soil with violent puffs. The termites are then sucked up through the muzzle, producing a sucking sound which can be heard 180 m away. Their sense of smell is strong enough to detect grubs 3 ft below ground. Unlike other bears, they do not congregate in feeding groups. Sloth bears diets can include fruit, plant matter, carrion, and very rarely other mammals. In March and April, they eat the fallen petals of mahua trees with their diets including a range of fruits including mangoes, maize, sugar cane, jackfruit, and the pods of the golden shower tree. Sloth bears also eat honey liberally. When feeding their cubs, sows are reported to regurgitate a mixture of half-digested jack fruit, wood apples, and pieces of honeycomb. This sticky substance hardens into a dark yellow, circular, bread-like mass which is fed to the cubs. This "bear's bread" is considered a delicacy by some of India's natives. Rarely, sloth bears can become addicted to sweets in hotel waste, visiting rubbish bins, even inside populated towns, all year long. Their diet includes animal flesh. Sloth bear diet shows strong seasonal shifts, with plant-related foods (e.g. fruits) dominating winter diets and insects (termites and ants) dominating their summer diets in the Aravalli hills of Rajasthan. Sloth bears in Rajasthan showed flexibility in their diets. The occurrence of Cassia fistula and Lantana camara seeds was correlated to the abundance of these two plants during winter, suggesting that sloth bears ate fruits of these two plants where available. Sloth bears also displayed moderate selectivity of several plants during summer including Cassia fistula, Diospyros melanoxylon, Ficus religiosa and Grewia flavescens, suggesting some active selection of fruits by sloth bears.

In Neyyar Wildlife Sanctuary, Kerala, seeds of six tree species eaten and excreted by sloth bears (Artocarpus hirsuta, A. integrifolia, Cassia fistula, Mangifera indica, Zizyphus oenoplina) did not see significantly different percentages of germination (appearance of cotyledon) when compared to germinated seeds that had not been passed through the gut of the bears. However, seeds germinated much faster after being ingested by bears for three species, Artocarpus hirsuta, Cassia fistula, and Zizyphus oenoplina. This experiment suggests that sloth bears may play an important role in seed dispersal and germination, with effects varying by tree species. In a second study conducted in the Aravalli hills of south Rajasthan, germination rate and speed of seeds of eight plant species were compared between seeds in bear scats and seeds from fruits taken from plants. Phoenix sylvestris seeds germinated earliest (< 50 days after sowing) and had the highest germination whether or not ingested by bears. Ficus religiosa did not germinate with either method. Seeds of five plants, Zizyphus nummularia, Grewia flavescens, Cassia fistula, Diospyros melanoxylon, and Lantana camara showed reduced seed dormancy and early germination when taken from sloth bear scats. Seeds of Cordia myxa germinated only from fruits taken from plants. This study showed sloth bears to display considerable endozoochory affecting both the number of seeds that survived and the rates of germination of several species that constituted major dietary items of the bears. The study also showed that bears may be helping the dispersal and faster rate of germination of the exotic invasive plant, Lantana camara.

=== Relationships with other animals ===
The large canine teeth of sloth bears, relative to both its overall body size and to the size of the canine teeth of other bear species, and the aggressive disposition of sloth bears, may be a defense in interactions with large, dangerous animals, such as the tiger, elephant, and rhinoceros, as well as prehistoric species such as Megantereon.

Bengal tigers occasionally prey on sloth bears. Tigers usually give sloth bears a wide berth, though some specimens may become habitual bear killers, and it is not uncommon to find sloth bear fur in tiger scats. Tigers typically hunt sloth bears by waiting for them near termite mounds, then creeping behind them and seizing them by the back of their necks and forcing them to the ground with their weight. One tiger was reported to simply break its victim's back with its paw, then wait for the paralysed bear to exhaust itself trying to escape before going in for the kill. When confronted by tigers face to face, sloth bears charge at them, crying loudly. A young or already sated tiger usually retreats from an assertive sloth bear, as the bear's claws can inflict serious wounds, and most tigers end the hunt if the bears become aware of the tiger's presence before the pounce. Sloth bears may scavenge on tiger kills. As tigers are known to mimic the calls of sambar deer to attract them, sloth bears react fearfully even to the sounds made by deer themselves. In 2011, a female bear with cubs was observed to stand her ground and prevail in a confrontation against two tigers (one female, one male) in rapid succession.

Besides tigers there are few predators of sloth bears. Leopards can also be a threat, as they are able to follow sloth bears up trees. Bear cubs are probably far more vulnerable and healthy adult bears may be avoided by leopards. One leopard killed a three-quarters grown female sloth bear in an apparently lengthy fight that culminated in the trees. Apparently, a sloth bear killed a leopard in a confrontation in Yala National Park, Sri Lanka, but was itself badly injured in the fight and was subsequently put down by park rangers. Sloth bears occasionally chase leopards from their kills. Dhole packs may attack sloth bears. When attacking them, dholes try to prevent the bear from retreating into caves. Unlike tigers which prey on sloth bears of all size, there is little evidence that dholes are a threat to fully-grown sloth bears other than exceptionally rare cases. In one case, a golden jackal (a species much smaller and less powerful than a sloth bear and not generally a pack hunter as is the dhole) was seen to aggressively displace an adult bear which passively loped away from the snapping canid, indicating the sloth bear does not regard other carnivores as competition.

Sloth bears are sympatric with Asiatic black bears in northern India, and the two species, along with the sun bear, coexist in some of the national parks and wildlife sanctuaries. They are also found together in Assam, Manipur, and Mizoram, in the hills south of the Brahmaputra River, the only places occupied by all three bear species. The three species do not act aggressively toward each other. This may be because the three species generally differ in habit and dietary preferences.

Asian elephants apparently do not tolerate sloth bears in their vicinity. The reason for this is unknown, as individual elephants known to maintain their composure near tigers have been reported to charge bears. The Indian rhinoceros has a similar intolerance for sloth bears, and will charge at them.

== Status and conservation ==
The sloth bear is listed in Schedule I of the Indian Wildlife Protection Act, 1972, which provides for its legal protection. Commercial international trade of the sloth bear, including parts and derivatives, is prohibited as it is listed in Appendix I of the Convention on International Trade in Endangered Species.

Fewer than 20,000 sloth bears are estimated to survive in the Indian subcontinent and Sri Lanka. To address the human-bear conflict, people may be educated about the conservation ethics, particularly among locals. To resolve this conflict, the basic issue of deteriorating habitat, which is the reason for the conflict between people and bears, improvements through government or community-based reforestation programmes, may be promoted. Sloth bears have also been found dead in traps, electrocuted, or killed by other means by poachers, with body parts (i.e. canines, claws, gall bladder, paws, etc) usually removed for the illegal wildlife trade. The population of sloth bears grows when they live in high-profile reserves that protect species, such as tigers and elephants. Directly managed reserves could conserve the sloth bear, hence such reserves must be supported. Managing garbage, especially hotel waste with foods, is essential in situations where sloth bears get used to entering towns with an increase in the number of accidental attacks on humans.

The government of India has banned use of sloth bears for entertainment, and a 'Sloth Bear Welfare Project' in the country has the objective of putting an end to their use for entertainment. However, their number in such activity is still large. Many organisations are helping in the conservation and preservation of sloth bears in safe places. Sloth bears previously used for entertainment are being rehabilitated in facilities like Agra Bear Rescue Facility run by Wildlife SOS and others. Major sloth bear sanctuaries in India include the Daroji Sloth Bear Sanctuary in Karnataka, and Jessore Sloth Bear Sanctuary in Gujarat. A Sloth Bear Conservation Reserve is proposed in Mirzapur district of Uttar Pradesh.

== Relationships with humans ==
=== Attacks on humans ===
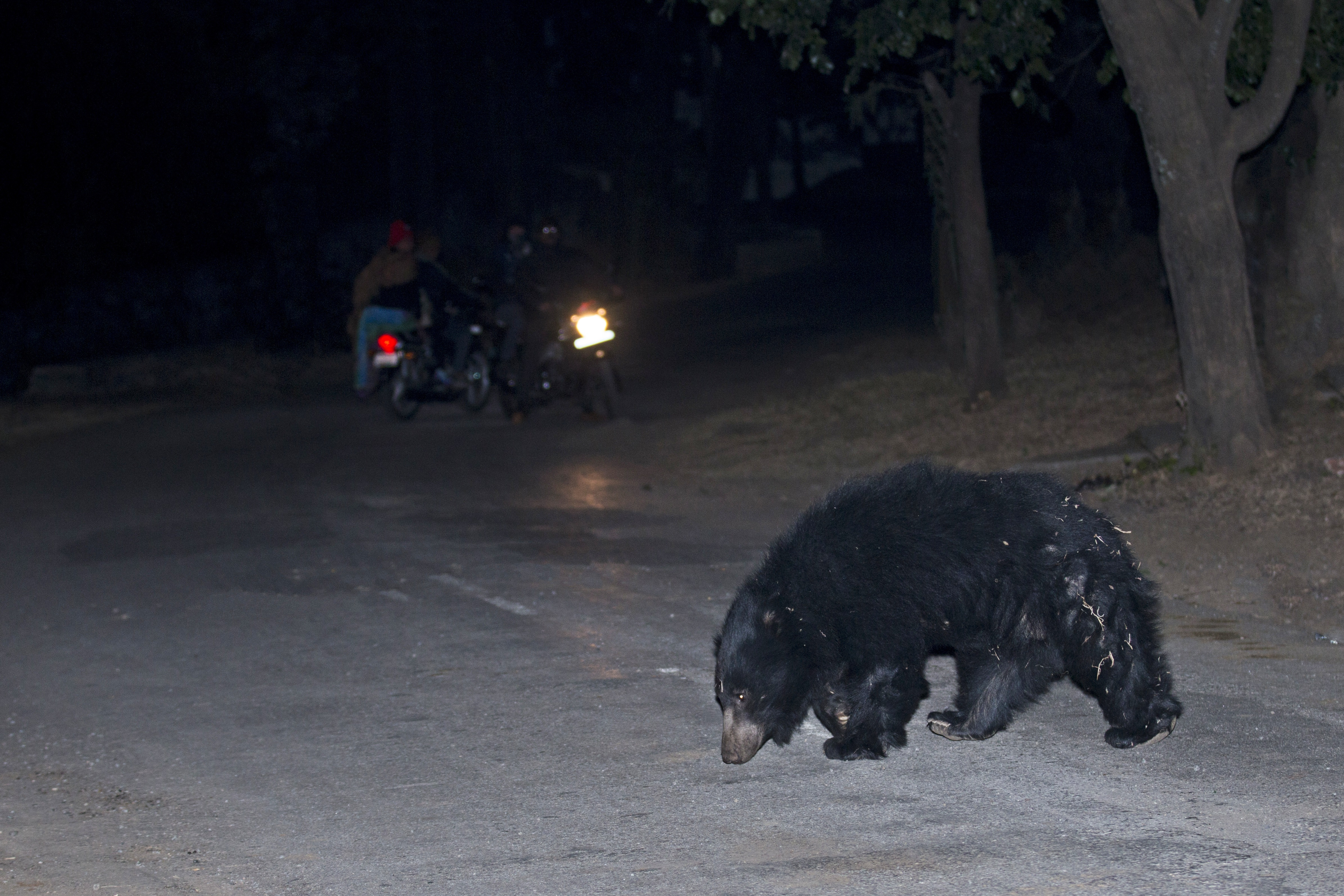
A fragile co-existence between bears and humans at Ratanmahal Sloth Bear Sanctuary, Dahod district, Gujarat, India

Sloth bears are one of the most aggressive extant bears and, due to large human populations often closely surrounding reserves that hold bears, aggressive encounters and attacks are relatively frequent, though in some places, attacks appear to be a reaction to encountering people accidentally. In absolute numbers, this is the species of bear that most regularly attacks humans. Only the Himalayan black bear subspecies of Asian black bear is nearly as dangerous. Sloth bears likely view humans as potential predators, as their reactions to them (roaring, followed by retreat or charging) are similar to those evoked in the presence of tigers and leopards. Their long claws, which are ideally adapted for digging at termite mounds, make adults less capable of climbing trees to escape danger, as are other bears such as Asian black bears. Therefore, sloth bears have seemingly evolved to deal with threats by behaving aggressively. For the same reason, brown bears can be similarly inclined, accounting for the relatively high incidence of seemingly non-predatory aggression towards humans in these two bear species.

According to Robert Armitage Sterndale, in his Mammalia of India (1884, p. 62):

[The sloth bear] is also more inclined to attack man unprovoked than almost any other animal, and casualties inflicted by it are unfortunately very common, the victim being often terribly disfigured even if not killed, as the bear strikes at the head and face. [William Thomas] Blanford was inclined to consider bears more dangerous than tigers...

Captain Williamson in his Oriental Field Sports wrote of how sloth bears rarely killed their human victims outright, but would suck and chew on their limbs until they were reduced to bloody pulps. One specimen, known as the sloth bear of Mysore, was responsible for the deaths of 12 people and the mutilation of 24 others. It was shot by Kenneth Anderson. Although sloth bears have attacked humans, they rarely become man-eaters. Dunbar-Brander's Wild Animals of Central India mentions a case in which a sow with two cubs began a six-week reign of terror in Chanda, a district of the Central Provinces, during which more than one of their victims had been eaten, while the sloth bear of Mysore partially ate at least three of its victims. R.G. Burton deduced from comparing statistics that sloth bears killed more people than Asian black bears, and Theodore Roosevelt considered them to be more dangerous than American black bears. Unlike some other bear species, which at times make mock charges at humans when surprised or frightened without making physical contact, sloth bears frequently appear to initiate a physical attack almost immediately. When people living near an aggressive population of sloth bears were armed with rifles, it was found that it was an ineffective form of defense, since the bear apparently charges and knocks the victim back (often knocking the rifle away) before the human has the chance to defend themself. In Madhya Pradesh, sloth bear attacks accounted for the deaths of 48 people and the injuring of 686 others between 1989 and 1994, probably due in part to the density of population and competition for food sources. A total of 137 attacks (resulting in 11 deaths) occurred between April 1998 and December 2000 in the North Bilaspur Forest Division of Chhattisgarh. The majority of attacks were perpetrated by single bears, and occurred in kitchen gardens, crop fields, and in adjoining forests during the monsoon season. One Mr. Watts Jones wrote a first-hand account of how it feels to be attacked by a sloth bear, recalling when he failed to score a direct hit against a bear he had targeted:

I do not know exactly what happened next, neither does my hunter who was with me; but I believe, from the marks in the snow, that in his rush the bear knocked me over backwards in fact, knocked me three or four feet away. When next I remember anything, the bear's weight was on me, and he was biting my leg. He bit two or three times. I felt the flesh crush, but I felt no pain at all. It was rather like having a tooth out with gas. I felt no particular terror, though I thought the bear had got me; but in a hazy sort of way I wondered when he would kill me, and thought what a fool I was to get killed by a stupid beast like a bear. The shikari then very pluckily came up and fired a shot into the bear, and he left me. I felt the weight lift off me, and got up. I did not think I was much hurt. ... The main wound was a flap of flesh torn out of the inside of my left thigh and left hanging. It was fairly deep, and I could see all the muscles working underneath when I lifted it up to clean the wound."

In 2016, according to a forest official, a female bear had killed three people, and hurt five others in Gujarat State's Banaskantha district, near Balaram Ambaji Wildlife Sanctuary, with some of the casualties being colleagues. At first, an attempt was made to trace and cage it, but this failed, costing the life of one official, and so a team of both officials and policemen shot the bear.

In Karnataka's Bellary district, most of the attacks by sloth bears occurred outside forests, when they entered settlements and farmlands in search of food and water.

In Mount Abu town in southern Rajasthan, sloth bears attacked people inside towns where they were seeking hotel waste in rubbish bins and encountered people by chance. Though such attacks were concomitant with increasing tourism activity, quite remarkably, local residents have not retaliated against the sloth bears. The absence of retaliation in many locations of India appears related to cultural norms and the dominant religion Hinduism where nature and animals are worshipped as deities.

=== Hunting and products ===
Illustration of British officers hunting a bear on horseback

One method of hunting sloth bears involved the use of beaters, in which case, a hunter waiting on a post could either shoot the approaching bear through the shoulder or on the white chest mark if it was moving directly to him. Sloth bears are very resistant to body shots, and can charge hunters if wounded, though someone of steady nerves could score a direct hit from within a few paces of a charging bear. Sloth bears were easy to track during the wet season, as their clear footprints could be followed straight to their lairs. The majority of sloth bears killed in forests were due to chance encounters with them during hunts for other game. In hilly or mountainous regions, two methods were used to hunt them there. One was to lie in wait above the bear's lair at dawn and wait for the bear to return from its nocturnal foraging. Another was to rouse them at daytime by firing flares into the cave to draw them out. Sloth bears were also occasionally speared on horseback. In Sri Lanka, the baculum of a sloth bear was once used as a charm against barrenness.

=== Tameability ===
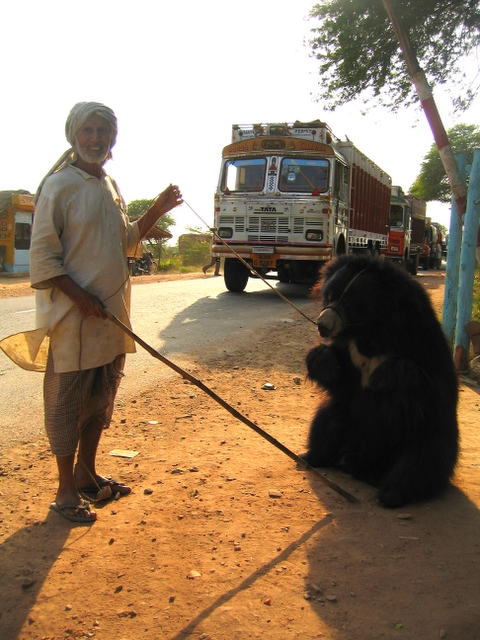
A bear and its handler in Pushkar

Officers in British India often kept sloth bears as pets. The wife of Kenneth Anderson kept an orphaned sloth bear cub from Mysore, which she named "Bruno". The bear was fed all sorts of things and was very affectionate toward people. It was even taught numerous tricks, such as cradling a woodblock like a baby or pointing a bamboo stick like a gun.

Dancing bears were historically a popular entertainment in India, dating back to the 13th century and the pre-Mughal era. The Kalandars, who practised the tradition of capturing sloth bears for entertainment purposes, were often employed in the courts of Mughal emperors to stage spectacles involving trained bears. They were once common in the towns of Calcutta, where they often disturbed the horses of British officers.

Despite a ban on the practice that was enacted in 1972, as many as 800 dancing bears were in the streets of India during the latter part of the 20th century, particularly on the highway between Delhi, Agra, and Jaipur. Sloth bear cubs, which were usually purchased at the age of six months from traders and poachers, were trained to dance and follow commands through coercive stimuli and starvation. Males were castrated at an early age, and their teeth were knocked out at the age of one year to prevent them from seriously injuring their handlers. The bears were typically fitted with a nose ring attached to a four-foot leash. Some were found to be blind from malnutrition.

In 2009, following a seven-year campaign by a coalition of Indian and international animal welfare groups, the last Kalandar dancing bear was set free. The effort to end the practice involved helping the bear handlers find jobs and education, which enabled them to reduce their reliance on income from the practice.

== Cultural references ==
Charles Catton included the bear in his 1788 book Animals Drawn from Nature and Engraved in Aqua-tinta, describing it as an "animal of the bear-kind" and saying it was properly called the "Petre Bear".

In Rudyard Kipling's The Jungle Book, Baloo "the sleepy old brown bear" teaches the Law of the Jungle to the wolf cubs of the Seeonee wolf pack, as well as to his most challenging pupil, the "man-cub" Mowgli. Robert Armitage Sterndale, from whom Kipling derived most of his knowledge of Indian fauna, used the Hindustani word bhalu for several bear species, though Daniel Karlin, who edited the Penguin Classics reissue of The Jungle Book in 1989, stated, with the exception of colour, Kipling's descriptions of Baloo are consistent with the sloth bear, as brown bears and Asian black bears do not occur in the Seoni area where the novel takes place. Also, the name "sloth" can be used in the context of sleepiness. Karlin states, however, that Baloo's diet of "only roots and nuts and honey" is a trait more common to the Asian black bear than to the sloth bear.

Local names:

- Assamese: ভালুক, romanized: bhaluk
- Gujarati: રીંછ, romanized: rīn̄ch; also rinchh
- Hindi: भालू, romanized: bhālū; रीछ, rīch
- Odia: ଭାଲ, romanized: bhālu
- Bengali: শ্লথ ভালুক, romanized: ślath bhaluk, kālō bhāluk; also bhaluk
- Sanskrit: ऋक्ष, romanized: ṛkṣa; also rikspa
- Kannada: ಕರಡಿ, romanized: karaḍi; kaddi
- Tamil: கரடி, romanized: karaṭi; kaddi
- Malayalam: കരടി, romanized: karaṭi
- Telugu: ఎలుగుబంటి, romanized: elugubaṇṭi; also elugu
- Marathi: अस्वल, romanized: asval; also aswal
- Gondi: yerid, yedjal and asol
- Kol: bana
- Oraon: bir mendi
- Sinhala: වලසා, valasā; also usa
- Nepali: भालु, bhālu
- Punjabi: ਰਿੱਛ, richh
