= Tame bear =

Wild bear raised for entertainment

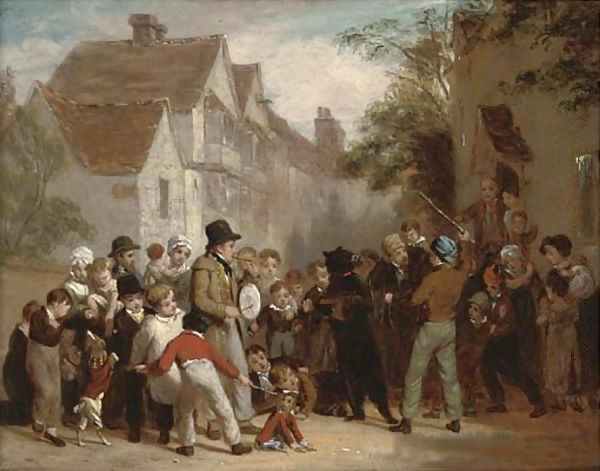
The dancing bear by William Frederick Witherington, England, 1822

A tame bear, often called a dancing bear, is a wild bear captured when young or born and bred in captivity. These bears have been used to entertain people in streets or taverns. Dancing bears were commonplace throughout Europe and Asia from the Middle Ages to the 19th century, and can still be found in the 21st century in some countries. In these countries, organizations and animal rights activists have sought to eliminate the practice, citing the mistreatment and abuse used to train the bears.

== Dancing bears ==
=== Training methods ===
Because dancing bears need to stand on hind legs to perform tricks, various methods have been employed to execute this behavior. One method involves trainers constantly feeding the bear from above, which acclimates the bear to standing on its hind legs, usually in response to a trained signal from the bear handler. Another tactic is considered inhumane today but is still practiced in some countries by semi-nomadic people living in extreme poverty. These handlers file down the bear's teeth and push a hot iron rod through the top of the bear's muzzle to create a permanent hole in the bear's nose and mouth. The handler then threads the hole with a knotted rope, so the bear can be pulled upright, inflicting pain on the bear as its motivation to stand. To make the bear dance, the animal might be put on a hot plate while music is played to condition it to move its feet out of fear and anxiety any time it hears music. Bears might also be starved in an attempt to render them less aggressive.

=== History ===
In ancient Rome, bears and monkeys were led to dance and perform tricks for the public. Following the fall of the Western Roman Empire, dancing bears continued to be commonplace throughout Europe and Asia. In Russia and Siberia, cubs were for centuries captured for being used as dancing bears accompanying tavern musicians (skomorokhi), as depicted in the Travels of Adam Olearius. By the fifteenth century, the practice began to dwindle in Western Europe and was officially banned in the UK in 1911. Dancing bears continued to appear frequently in Eastern Europe and Asia until the late 20th century.

In 2007, the presence of dancing bears at a circus in Spain prompted public outcry. In the same year, in Bulgaria, the last dancing bears were rescued and brought to Bear Sanctuary Belitsa by the animal welfare organisation Four Paws, despite the practice having been illegal since 1998. In 2009, Four Paws rescued the last dancing bears of Serbia.

Dancing bears were banned in India under the 1972 Wildlife Protection Act - but the practice continued illegally, primarily in Qalandar communities, who have performed with dancing bears since the late Vedic era. In 2009, the animal rescue organisation Wildlife SOS reported that the last dancing bear had been saved. However, there have been subsequent reports of the practice resurfacing in at least 7 states across India. In 2017, the last known dancing bears of Nepal were rescued.

=== French bear handlers ===
Traveling with a bear was very popular in France at the end of the 19th century, between 1870 and 1914. More than 600 men from Ariège in the French Pyrenees trained bear cubs found in the mountains near their home. Among them, 200 traveled to North America arriving at the ports of New York, Quebec, Montreal and Halifax from the ports of Liverpool, Glasgow and Belfast. They would leave their home early in spring, walking from the Pyrenees through France and England, earning money for the crossing in order to arrive in North America in May or June.

=== Gallery ===
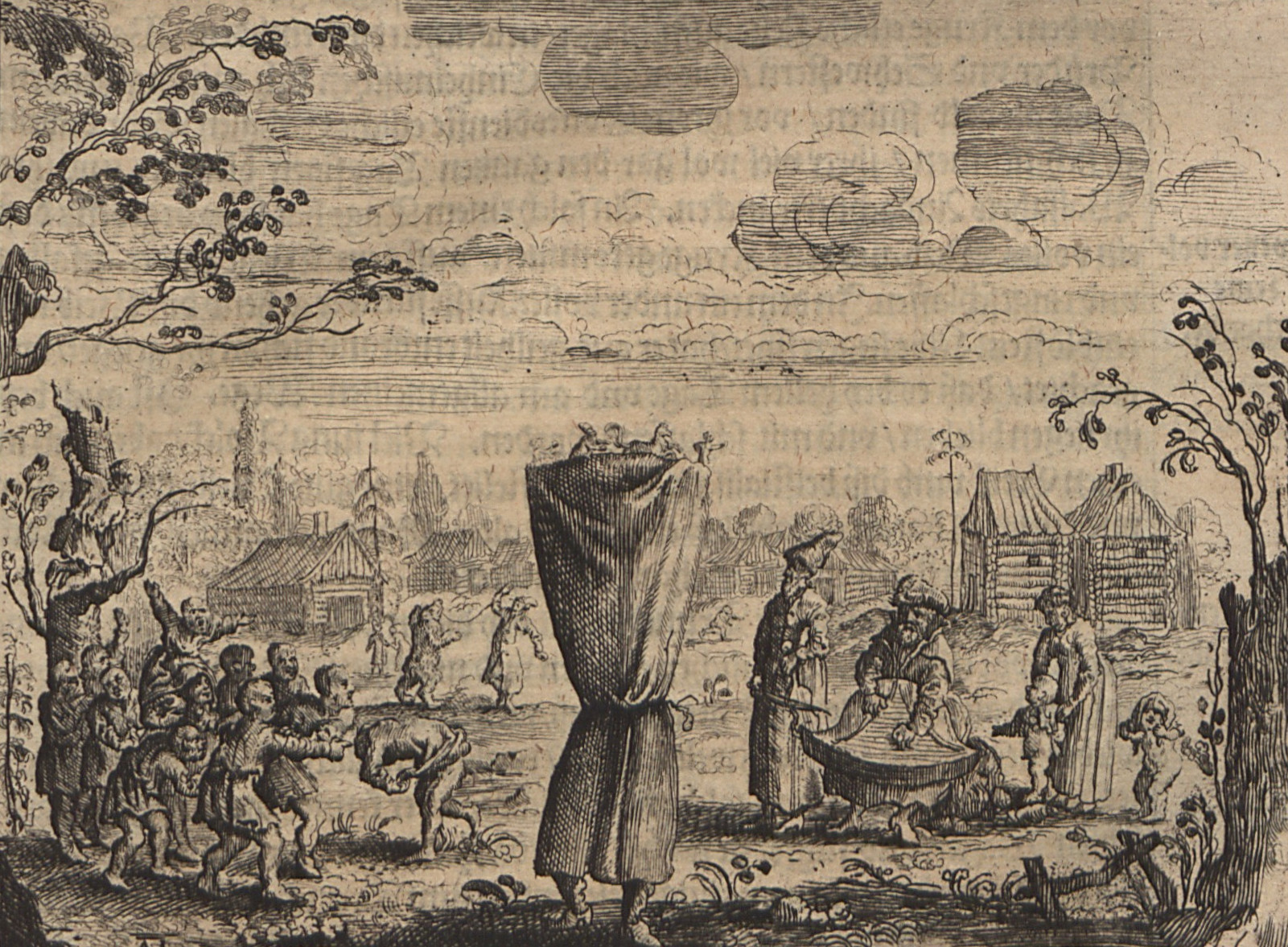
Engraving with dancing bear from Adam Olearius's Travels, 1656

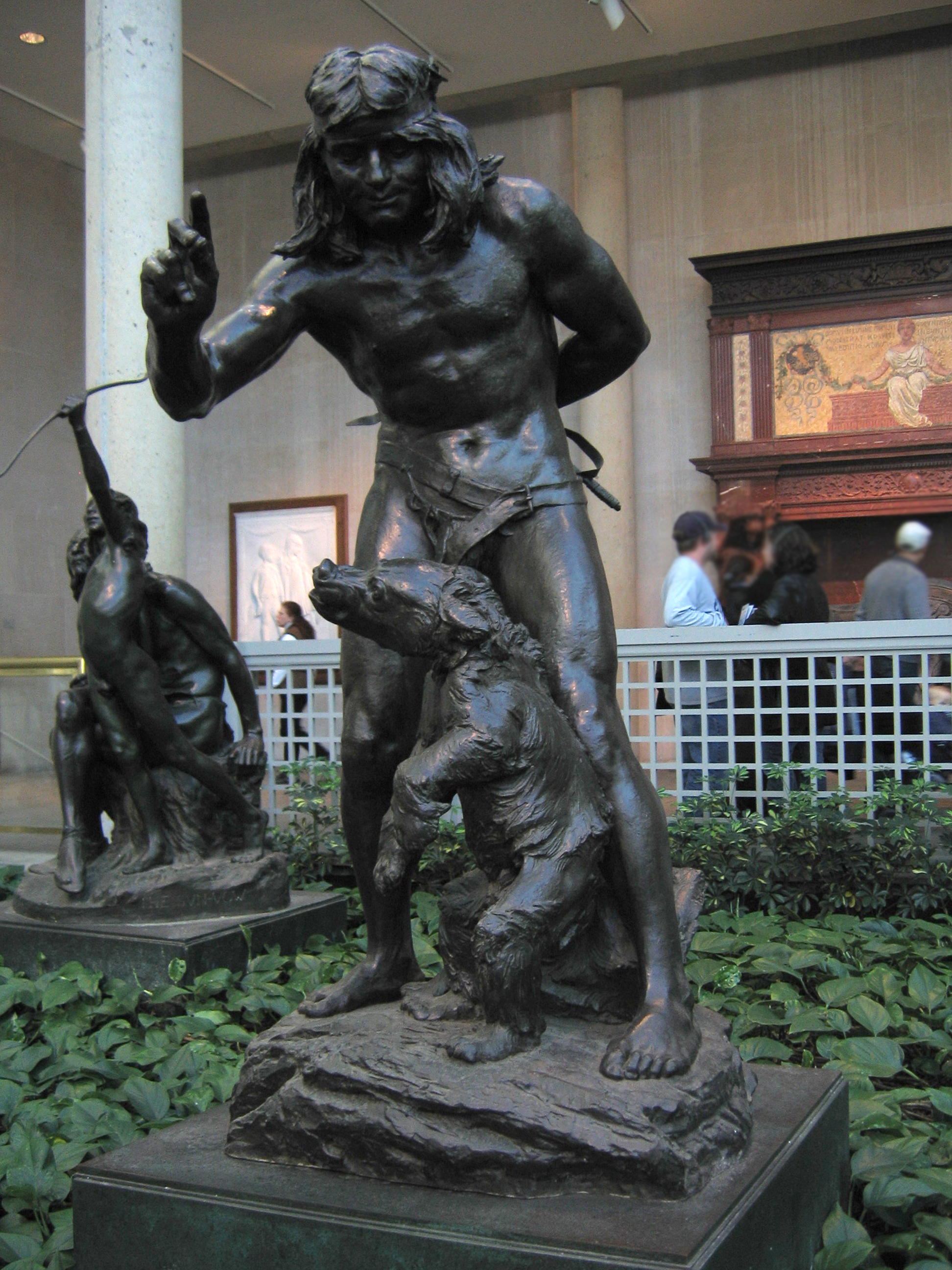
Bohemian Bear Tamer, 1888 cast by Paul Wayland Bartlett

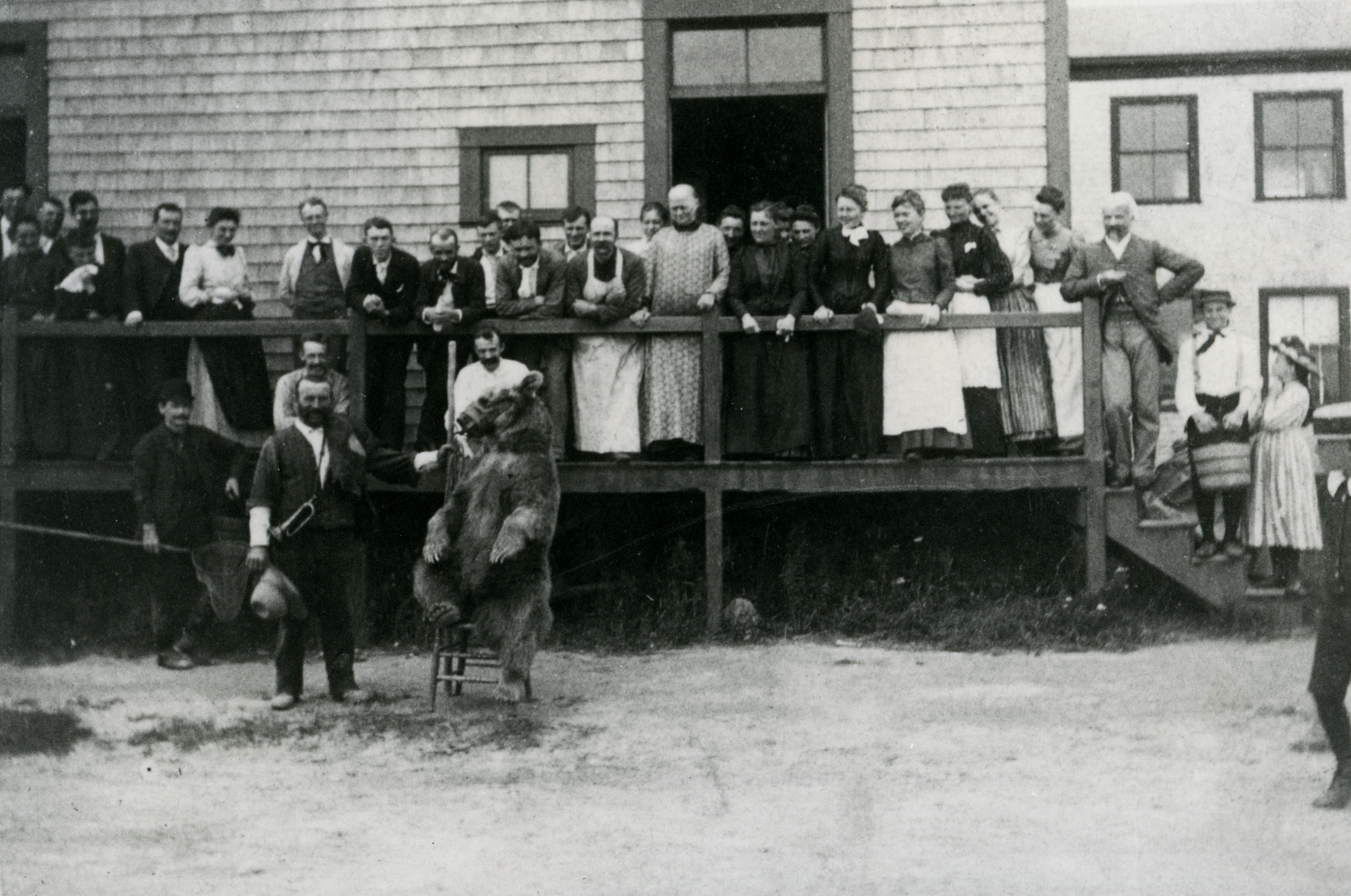
Josephine the Bear in Woods Hole, Massachusetts, c. 1915

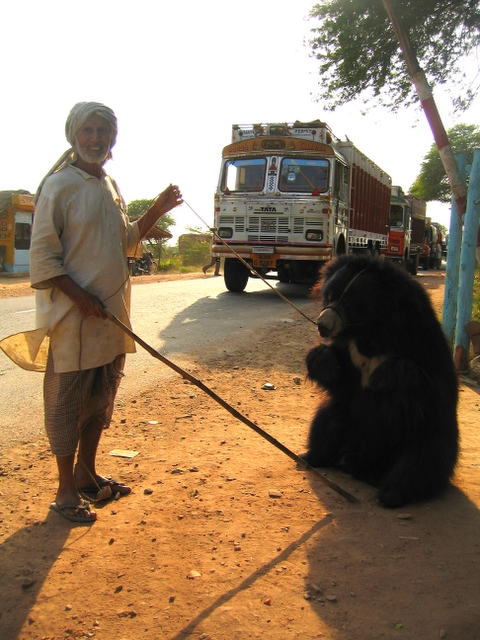
A dancing bear in Pushkar, India, 2003

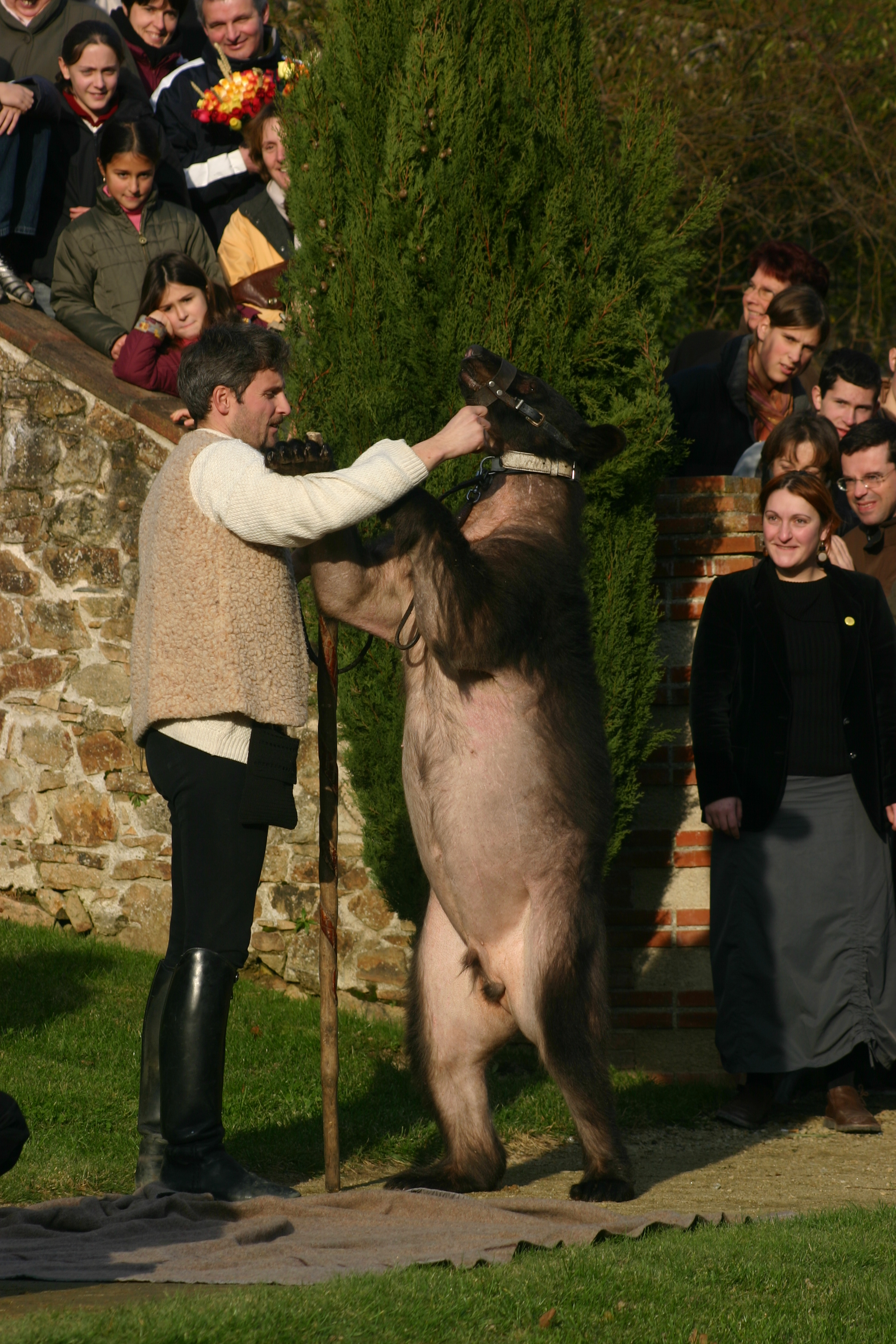
Dancing bear in France, 2007

== See also ==
- Iomante
- The Bear Comes Home
- Ursari
- Bear-baiting
- Corbinian's Bear
- Wojtek (bear)
