= Dog Meat Festival =

Annual food festival originating in Yulin, China

Dog Meat Festival 狗肉节
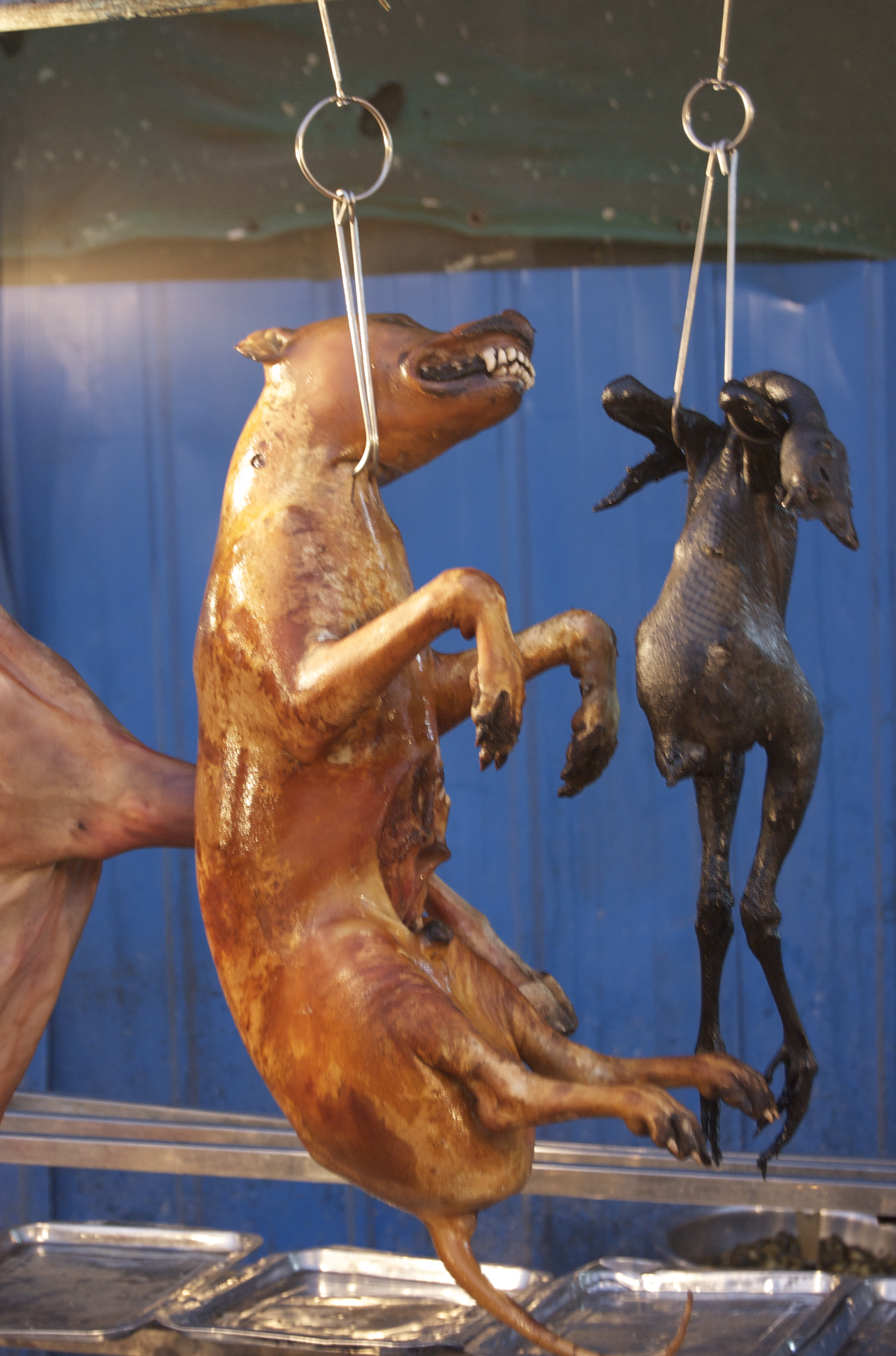
- Status: Active
- Genre: Festival
- Begins: 21 June
- Ends: 30 June
- Frequency: Annually
- Location: Yulin, Guangxi
- Coordinates: 22°38′N 110°09′E
- Country: China
- Inaugurated: 21 June 2009
- Most recent: 21 June 2025
- Previous event: 21 June 2024

The Dog Meat Festival (Chinese: 狗肉节), also known as the Yulin Dog Meat Festival or Lychee and Dog Meat Festival, is an annual festival held in Yulin, Guangxi, China, during the summer solstice from 21 June to 30 June in which festival observers consume dog meat accompanied by lychees or other plants.

The festival began in 2009 and lasts about ten days. During this time, thousands of dogs are consumed. The festival has drawn criticism domestically and internationally.

== Background ==
The festival is celebrated annually in Yulin, Guangxi, China, during the summer solstice in June, by eating dog meat. Early on, it was reported that roughly 10,000 dogs had been consumed for each annual occurrence of the festival. This number is estimated by some to have decreased to 1,000 in 2015. In 2018 it was estimated that 3,000 dogs were killed. The festival was launched on 21 June 2009.

== Concerns ==
=== Animal cruelty ===
The festival organizers claim that the dogs are killed humanely and that "eating dog is no different from eating pork or beef". Animal rights activists and campaigners, however, claim that the animals are treated cruelly. Some media outlets have reported that dogs are intentionally tortured or boiled alive to improve the taste of their meat. Several other reports have stated that since 2015 there has been little evidence for those allegations. The festival is a relatively recent event, not rooted in tradition, but rather created in 2010 by dog traders to increase their profits. Prior to its inception, Yulin had no historical background of engaging in mass dog slaughter and consumption. As consuming dog meat is not prohibited by law in China, authorities argue that they have no legal basis to intervene.

=== Dog theft ===
A 2015 report by Animals Asia Foundation stated that most dogs that are consumed are strays or stolen pets. Approximately 70% of rural villages surveyed in China have suffered mysterious dog losses.

=== Health concerns ===
Epidemiological surveys of dogs across nine Chinese provinces or autonomous regions found Trichinella prevalence ranging from 7% in Henan to 39.5% in Heilongjiang, with an overall prevalence of 21.1% among 19,662 dogs examined. Dog meat sold at markets showed similar infection rates; in Kunming, Yunnan province, 3.9% of dog meat samples contained Trichinella larvae.

== Changes in 2020 ==
Amidst the COVID-19 pandemic, the Ministry of Agriculture of the People's Republic of China officially declared that dogs are companions, and should not be treated as livestock, thereby banning their commercial slaughter and sale.

During February, the city of Yulin made a statement to put a ban to the dog consumption market, stating that as an effort to combat coronavirus. However, the festival resumed on 21 June 2020 in defiance of the government campaign, although reportedly with a dwindling number of attendees.

== Reactions ==
=== Domestic ===
In 2016, 1,000 dogs were rescued from the festival; the previous week 34 animals (21 dogs, eight puppies, and five cats and kittens) were rescued from a slaughter facility in Yulin by Humane Society International. Another 1,000 dogs were saved by Chinese animal right activists in 2017.

Millions of Chinese in 2016 voted in support of a legislative proposal by Zhen Xiaohe, a deputy to the National People's Congress of China, to ban the dog meat trade. A petition in China the same year, which garnered 11 million signatures and called for an end to the festival, was presented to Yulin government offices in Beijing. Reports from 2014 and 2016 have also suggested that the majority of Chinese both on and offline disapprove of the festival. Chinese celebrities such as Fan Bingbing, Chen Kun, Sun Li and Yang Mi have also publicly expressed a distaste for the event.

In 2017, over 1,300 dogs were rescued by activists. After a tip, a truck transporting the dogs was blocked. Police confirmed that the majority of the dogs were stolen and not allowed for consumption, allowing volunteers to rescue the dogs. Up to 40% of the dogs also carried infectious diseases.

A survey by Humane World for Animals published in June 2025 indicates that in Yulin a significant proportion of the population (88%) would not consider themselves inconvenienced if dogmeat consumption were banned.

Per capita dogmeat consumption in China is relatively low with an estimated 10 million dogs eaten per year across the whole of China.

=== State media ===
In a 2014 statement released to Xinhua, Yulin's local government denies any official involvement or endorsement of the festival itself, and describes the event as a local custom observed by "a small percentage" of Yulin's residents. They attribute the branding of the event to local businesses and residents.

An editorial published by the People's Daily expressed the view that while activists understand dogs as "companion animals", neither the Chinese legal system nor the current Chinese public recognizes them with this special status. While noting the "duality" of dogs as both companions and food items, the editorial urges restraint in handling the issue and calls for mutual understanding from both organizers and activists in reaching a respectful compromise.

=== Media campaigns ===
Campaigns have had an impact on spreading awareness of the festival around the globe. Many activists and public figures take to Twitter, Facebook, and Instagram and have created hashtags such as "#stopyulinforever", "#stopyulin2015", "#stopyulin2016", and "#stopyulin2020" to spread the word. Due in part to social media campaigns both in and outside of China, the number of dogs slaughtered has apparently decreased since 2013 to 1,000 in 2016, although the festival is still being held in 2021.

=== News ===
Amidst reporting on clashes between Chinese animal advocates and dog meat traders, The New York Times interviewed professor Peter J. Li of the University of Houston–Downtown on his views of the allegations from dog meat traders that local activists had introduced a harmful Western ideology into China. Li replied that the opposition to eating dog meat at the festival began with the Chinese, as "the bond between companion animals and humans is not Western. It's a transcultural phenomenon".

The director of Animal Protection and Crisis Response for Humane Society International explained in an article on CNN the reasons for his opposition to the festival and called on the Yulin government to cancel the festival.

In 2016, an article written by the BBC noted that the festival began amid widespread criticism, saying, "Activists say the event is cruel, and this year a petition calling for it to be banned collected 11 million signatures."

An article in The Guardian by Jill Robinson said that the dog meat trade is "steeped in illegality" and the reason why dogs are special and deserve kind treatment is because "they are friends and helpers of humankind." Another article by Julian Baggini that was published in the same news outlet said that what should be most appalling about the festival "is not which particular animal is being killed, but that too many animals in the West are treated nearly or just as cruelly" and that "vegans are the only group who can oppose the festival without any fear of hypocrisy".

An article in The Independent encouraged protests against the festival but also compared the festival with the 1.9 million animals "brutally slaughtered" in the UK every month and noted that "the western distinction between dogs and farm animals is completely arbitrary". An article in The Diamondback further questioned whether the large amount of criticism towards the festival was truly due to animal rights instead of cultural relativism, arguing that chickens being "drowned alive in scalding tanks" or left to "freeze to death in slaughterhouse trucks" was another cruel practice in the US that had garnered less attention. In 2021 a small poodle covered in maggots was rescued from a truck heading to the Festival by British campaign group NoToDogMeat.

Another article on CBS news wrote about the conflicting opinions in China about eating dog meat. However, most of China's population agrees on the stopping of the dog trade. Du Feng, a Chinese rights campaigner states that though police are present, they don't really do anything to stop the trade from happening. China's most controversial celebration of food, this lychee and dog meat festival in the city of Yulin, faces negative press every year, being widely condemned by dog lovers around the world.

=== Social media ===
The outrage on social media over the 2014 festival was unprecedented.

In June 2015, an online petition against the festival was started in the United Kingdom, gathering over 4 million signatures. In 2016 Humane Society International organised a petition in opposition to the dog eating festival which was signed by 11 million people worldwide.

A 2016 survey conducted by Chinese polling company Horizon, found that 64% of Chinese citizens want to see an end to the Yulin festival.

=== International ===
In 2015, actor and comedian Ricky Gervais brought attention to the issue by urging people to get behind Humane Society International's campaign to shut down China's dog and cat meat trade, including the infamous Yulin Dog Meat Festival.

U.S. Representative Alcee Hastings introduced, alongside 27 original cosponsors, a bipartisan resolution (House Resolution 752) in 2016 which condemned the annual festival in Yulin and called on the Chinese government to prohibit the dog meat trade outright. The resolution was supported by the Humane Society of the United States, Humane Society Legislative Fund, and Humane Society International. In 2017, Hastings reintroduced, alongside 49 original co-sponsors, his 2016 bipartisan resolution through House Resolution 30.

The festival has also been condemned in an Early Day Motion signed by Jeremy Corbyn, former leader of the UK Labour Party.

Celebrities and citizens including Joaquin Phoenix, Matt Damon, Sia, Bill Maher, Lisa Vanderpump, Ricky Gervais, George Lopez, Ian Somerhalder, Leona Lewis, Lori Alan, Tom Kenny, Rob Zombie and Anushka Sharma have publicly denounced the festival.

== See also ==
- Dog meat
- Dog meat consumption in Nigeria
- Dog meat consumption in South Korea
- Dog meat consumption in Vietnam
