= Bile bear =

Bears kept in captivity to harvest their bile

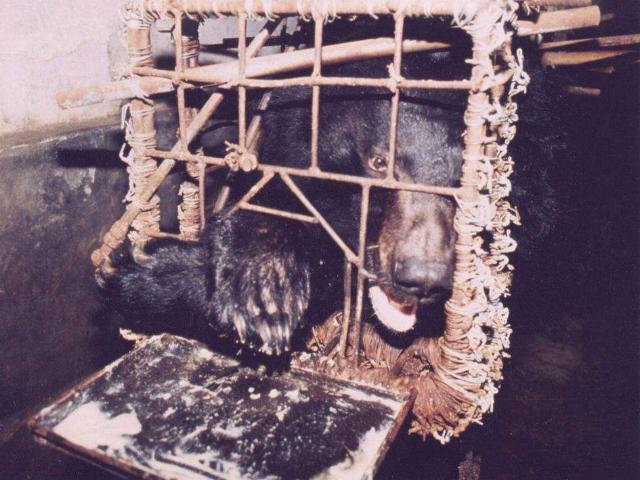
A bile bear in a "crush cage" on Huizhou Farm, Huizhou, China

Bile bears, sometimes called battery bears, are bears kept in captivity to harvest their bile, a digestive fluid produced by the liver and stored in the gallbladder, which is used by some traditional Asian medicine practitioners. It is estimated that 12,000 bears are farmed for bile in China, South Korea, Laos, Vietnam, and Myanmar.

The bear species most commonly farmed for bile is the Asiatic black bear (Ursus thibetanus), although the sun bear (Helarctos malayanus), brown bear (Ursus arctos) and every other bear species are also used (the only exception being the giant panda which does not produce UDCA). Both the Asiatic black bear and the sun bear are listed as Vulnerable on the Red List of Threatened Animals published by the International Union for Conservation of Nature. Bile was historically collected through bear hunting, but factory farming has become common since hunting was banned in the 1980s.

The bile can be harvested using several techniques, all of which require some degree of surgery, and may leave a permanent fistula or inserted catheter. A significant proportion of the bears die because of the stress of unskilled surgery or the infections which may occur.

Farmed bile bears are housed continuously in small cages which often prevent them from standing or sitting upright, or from turning around. These highly restrictive cage systems and the low level of skilled husbandry can lead to a wide range of welfare concerns including physical injuries, pain, severe mental stress and muscle atrophy. Some bears are caught as cubs and may be kept in these conditions for up to 30 years.

The value of the bear products trade is estimated as high as $2 billion. The practice of factory farming bears for bile has been extensively condemned by physicians both in China and abroad.

Bear species farmed for collecting bile

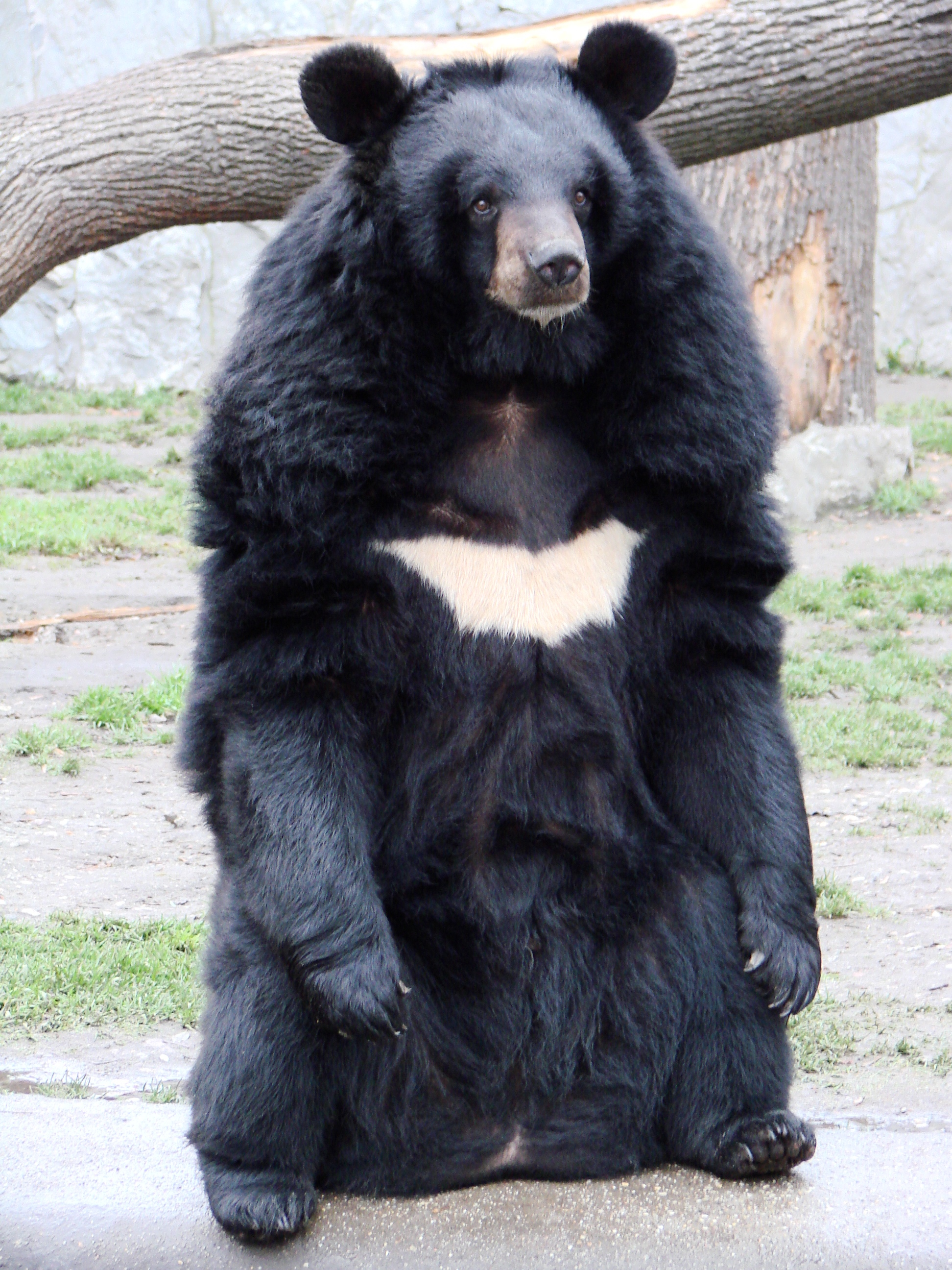
Asiatic black bear

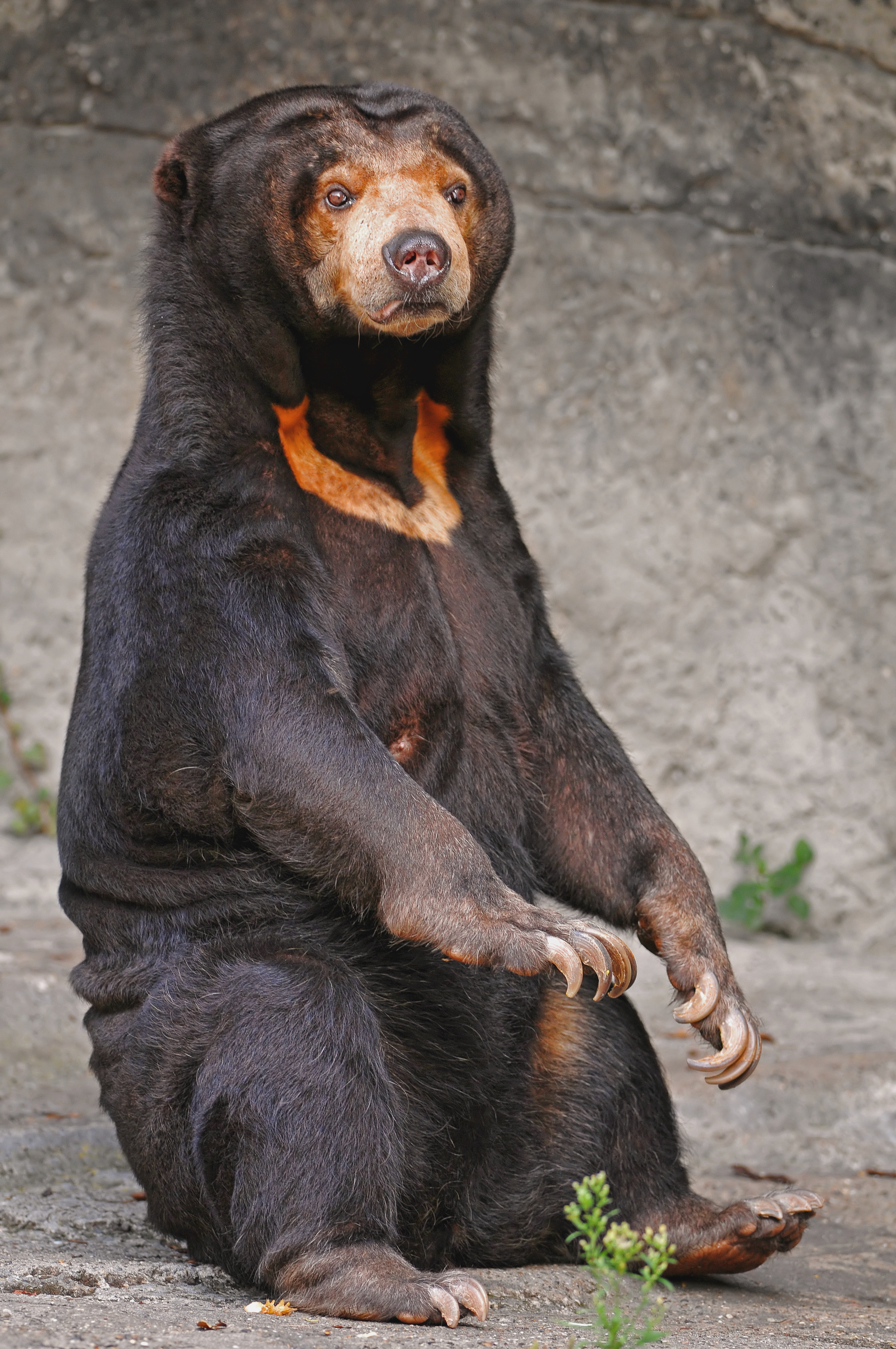
Sun bear

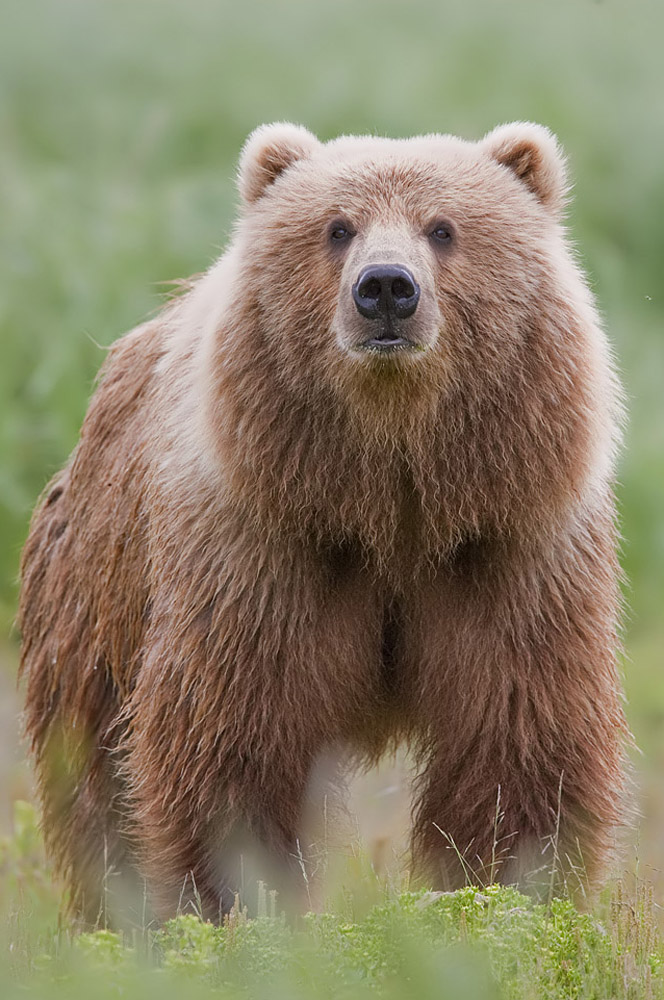
Brown bear

== History ==
Bear bile and gallbladders, which store bile, are ingredients in traditional Chinese medicine (TCM). Its first recorded use is found in Tang Ban Cao (Newly Revised Materia Medica, Tang dynasty, 659 CE). The pharmacologically active ingredient contained in bear bile and gallbladders is ursodeoxycholic acid (UDCA); bears are the only mammals to produce significant amounts of UDCA.

Initially, bile was collected from wild bears which were killed and the gall and its contents cut from the body. In the early 1980s, methods of extracting bile from live bears were developed in North Korea and farming of bile bears began. This rapidly spread to China and other regions. Bile bear farms started to reduce hunting of wild bears, with the hope that if bear farms raised a self-sustaining population of productive animals, poachers would have little motivation to capture or kill bears in the wild.

The demand for bile and gallbladders exists in Asian communities throughout the world, including the European Union and the United States. This demand has led to bears being hunted in the US specifically for this purpose.

== Methods of bile extraction ==
Several methods can be used to extract the bile. These all require surgery and include:

- Repeated percutaneous biliary drainage uses an ultrasound imager to locate the gallbladder, which is then punctured and the bile extracted.
- Permanent implantation uses a tube entered into the gallbladder through the abdomen. According to the Humane Society of the United States (HSUS), the bile is usually extracted twice a day through such implanted tubes, producing 10–20 ml of bile during each extraction.
- Catheterization involves pushing a steel or perspex catheter through the bear's abdomen and into the gallbladder.
- The full-jacket method uses a permanent catheter tube to extract the bile which is then collected in a plastic bag set in a metal box worn by the bear.
- The free drip method involves making a permanent hole, or fistula, in the bear's abdomen and gallbladder, from which bile freely drips out. The wound is vulnerable to infection, and bile can leak back into the abdomen, causing high mortality rates. Sometimes, the hole is kept open with a perspex catheter, which HSUS writes causes severe pain. An AAF Vet Report states that surgeries to create free-dripping fistulae caused bears great suffering as they were performed without appropriate antibiotics or pain management and the bears were repeatedly exposed to this process as the fistulae often healed over.
- Removal of the whole gallbladder is sometimes used. This method is used when wild bears are killed for their bile.

It has been estimated that 50–60 per cent of bears die from complications caused by the surgery or improper post-surgical care.

== Housing and husbandry ==
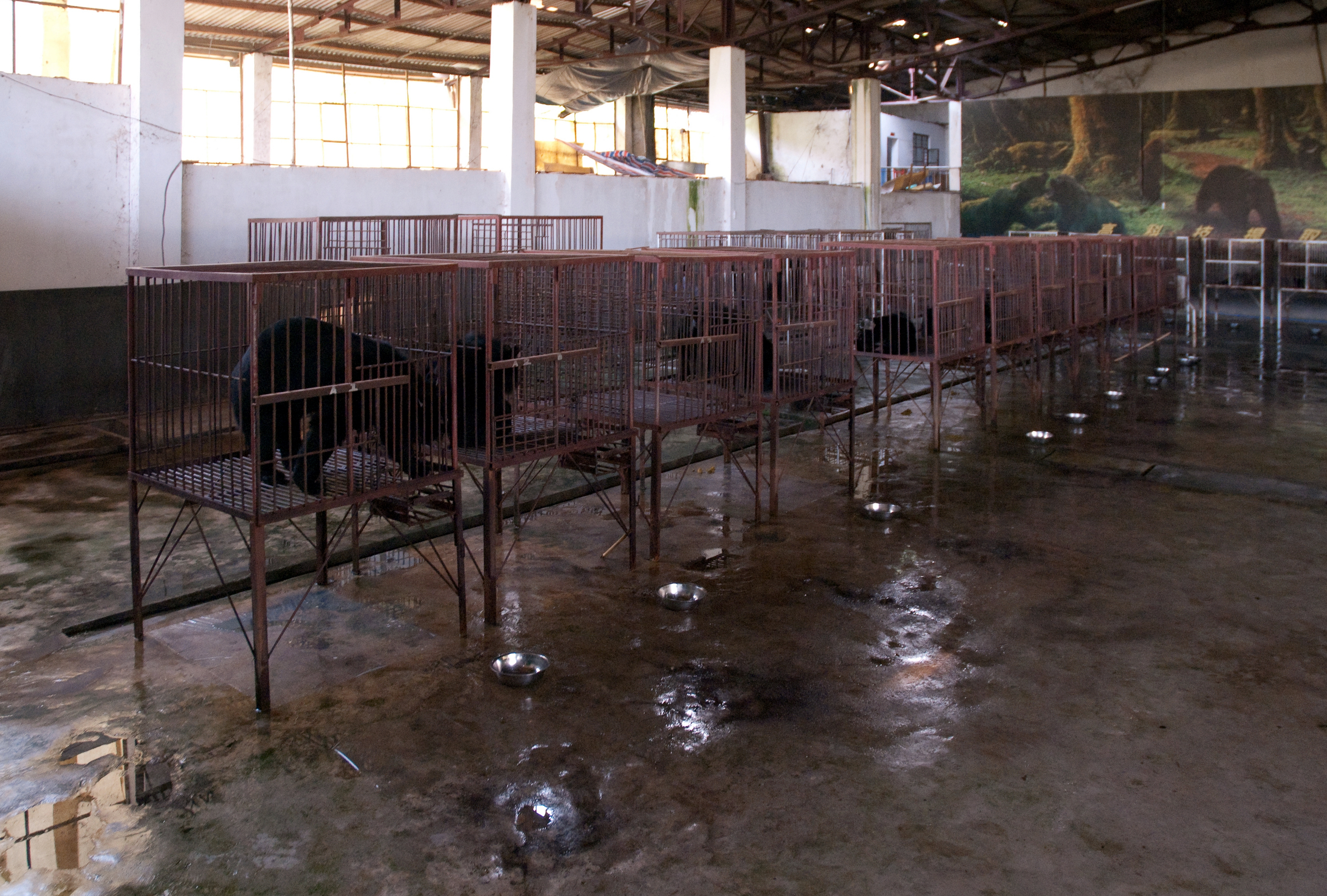
Bears are commonly kept in extraction cages

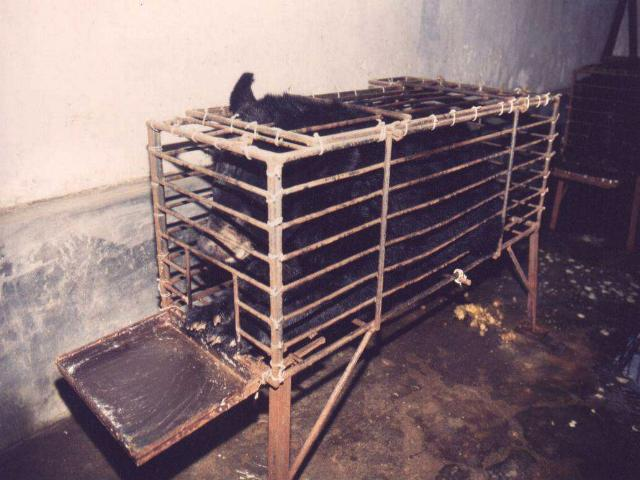
A bile bear rescued from captivity in Vietnam, now living in China.

Cubs are sometimes caught in the wild and used to supplement numbers held captive in farms. In 2008, it was reported that bear farms were paying the equivalent of US$280 to US$400 for a wild bear cub.

Bile extraction begins at three years-of-age and continues for a minimum of five to ten years. Some bears may be kept in cages for bile extraction for 20 years or more. A bear can produce 2.2 kg of bile over a 5-year production life.

When the bears outlive their productive bile-producing years (around 10 years old), they are often slaughtered and harvested for their other body parts such as meat, fur, paws and gallbladders; bear paws are considered a delicacy.

To facilitate the bile extraction process, mature bears are usually kept in small cages measuring approximately 130 x 70 x 60 cm. These cages are so small they prevent the bears from being able to sit upright, stand or turn around. Some bears are kept in crush cages, the sides of which can be moved inwards to restrain the bear. The HSUS reports that some bears are moved to a crush cage for milking, but the remainder of the time live in a cage large enough to stand and turn around.

Bile bears are often subjected to other procedures which have their own concomitant ethical and welfare concerns. These include declawing in which the third phalanx of each front digit is amputated to prevent the bears from self-mutilating or harming the farm workers. They may also have their hind teeth removed for the same reasons. These procedures are often conducted by unskilled farm staff and may result in the bears experiencing constant pain thereafter.

Pathology reports have shown that bile from sick bears is often contaminated with blood, pus, faeces, urine, bacteria and cancer cells.

== Welfare concerns ==
International concern about the welfare of bile bears began in 1993. Many bile bear farms have little or no veterinary supervision and the animal husbandry is often conducted by non-skilled attendants. In combination with the impacts of small cage sizes, their spacing and lack of internal structures, there are several indicators of poor welfare.

=== Physiological indicators ===
Elevated corticosteroid concentrations are a widely acknowledged indicator of physiological stress. Corticosteroid concentrations in the hair of Asiatic black bears relocated from a bile farm to a bear rescue centre fell between 12 and 88% over 163 days. Other physiological indicators of stress and potentially reduced welfare include growth retardation and ulcers.

A 2000 survey revealed that bile bears suffered from sores, skin conditions, ectoparasites, hair loss, bone deformities, injuries, swollen limbs, dental and breathing problems, diarrhoea and scarring.

One survey of 165 bears removed from a farm showed that (out of 181 free-drip bears), 163 (90%) had cholecystitis, 109 (66%) had gallbladder polyps, 56 (34%) had abdominal herniation, 46 (28%) had internal abscessation, 36 (22%) had gallstones, and 7 (4%) had peritonitis. Many of the bears had a combination of these conditions.

=== Behavioural indicators ===
Academic sources have reported that bile bears exhibit abnormal behaviours such as stereotypies, lethargy, anxiety, and self-mutilation.

=== Longevity and mortality ===
Farmed bile bears live to an average age of five years old whereas healthy captive bears can live up to 35 years of age and wild bears for between 25 and 30 years.

== Legislation ==
=== China ===
In 1994, Chinese authorities announced that no new bear farms would be licensed and in 1996, issued a special notice stating that no foreign object was allowed to be inserted into a bear body. No bears younger than 3 years of age and lighter than 100 kg were to be used for bile extraction, and bears could be confined in cages only during the time of bile extraction. The authorities required the adoption of the free-drip method which necessitates the creation of an artificial fistula between the gallbladder and the abdominal wall by opening a cut into the gallbladder.

In 2006, the Chinese State Council Information Office said that it was enforcing a "Technical Code of Practice for Raising Black Bears", which "requires hygienic, painless practice for gall extraction and make strict regulations on the techniques and conditions for nursing, exercise and propagation". However, a 2007 veterinary report published by the Animals Asia Foundation (AAF) stated that the Technical Code was not being enforced and that many bears were still spending their entire lives in small extraction cages without free access to food or water. The report also noted that the free-dripping technique promoted in the Technical Code was unsanitary as the fistula was an open portal through which bacteria could infiltrate the abdomen. The report also stated that surgeries to create free-dripping fistulae caused bears great suffering as they were performed without appropriate antibiotics or pain management and the bears were repeatedly exposed to this process as the fistulae often healed over. The free-dripping method still requires the bears to be prodded with a metal rod when the wound heals over and under veterinary examination, some bears with free-dripping fistulae were actually found to have clear perspex catheters permanently implanted into their gallbladders. In addition to the suffering caused by infection and pain at the incision site, 28% of fistulated bears also experience abdominal hernias and more than one-third eventually succumb to liver cancer, believed to be associated with the bile-extraction process.

=== South Korea ===
In South Korea, bear farming was declared illegal in 1992. However, it was reported in 2008 that over 1,300 bears were still on 108 farms where farmers were hoping that legal farming would resume. As of 2008, wild bears over the age of ten could still be legally killed for their gallbladders in South Korea.

=== Vietnam ===
The Vietnamese government in 2005 made it illegal to extract bear bile and made a commitment to phase out bear farming. In 2008, there were still 3,410 bears on farms in Vietnam.

== Alternative sources ==
There are two alternative sources for bile from farmed bears, i.e. wild bears and synthetic sources.

=== Wild bears ===
Bile from farmed bears is considered inferior to bile and gall from wild bears.

==== Implications for conservation ====
Officially, 7,600 captive bears are farmed in China. According to Chinese officials, 10,000 wild bears would need to be killed each year to produce as much bile. Government officials see farming as a reasonable answer to the loss of wild bears from poaching and are insouciant about animal welfare concerns. However, the government's agreement to allow the rescue of 500 bears may represent a softening of this stance.

Earthtrust reported in 1994 that demand for bear parts from South Korea and Taiwan was one of the greatest threats to bear populations worldwide. Due to partnerships between some South Korean travel companies and South Korean bear farmers, 'bear bile tourism' from the country has reportedly helped fuel the farming industry in China and Vietnam.

World Animal Protection reported in 2002 that Japan's demand for bear bile remained at a level of at least 200 kg per year which in theory would require 10,000 bears killed to be satisfied. Legislation and enforcement for bear products in the country has also been lacking.

A 2015 report indicated that the illegal trade in bear bile and gallbladder for traditional medicine is open and widespread across Malaysia and is potentially a serious threat to wild bears. In a survey of 365 traditional medicine shops across Malaysia, 175 (48%) claimed to be selling bear gallbladders and medicinal products containing bear bile.

Some supporters of bile bear farms argue, "Wildlife farming offers, at first glance, an intuitively satisfying solution: a legal trade can in principle be created by farming animals to assuage demand for wild animals which thus need not be harvested."

Nonetheless, bears continue to be hunted in the wild to supply the bile farms. A survey in 2000 reported that almost all of the farms in the study supplemented their captive population of bile bears with wild-caught bears. This is claimed to be necessary because of difficulties with captive breeding. Consumers of bear bile have a strong preference for bile produced from wild bears; bile from farms may, therefore, not be a perfect substitute for bile from wild bears. Bear farming in Laos may be increasing the incentive to poach wild bears.

A review of multiple types of wildlife tourist attractions concluded that bile bear farms had negative impacts on both animal welfare and conservation.

==== Poaching in the United States ====
In the late 1980s, US park rangers began finding bear carcasses missing only gallbladders and paws. Initially, it was considered that occasional hunters were the cause, but investigations uncovered evidence that large commercial organizations were dealing in poaching and smuggling. During a three-year operation (Operation SOUP) ending in 1999, 52 people were arrested and 300 gallbladders seized in Virginia. Another investigation in Oregon led police to bring racketeering charges against an organisation that poached an estimated 50 to 100 bears per year for a decade. It was estimated in 2008 that in North America, 40,000 American black bears are poached illegally for their gallbladders and paws each year.

=== Synthetic sources ===
The pharmacologically active ingredient contained in bear bile is ursodeoxycholic acid (UDCA). This can be synthesized using cow or pig bile, or even using no animal ingredients. The generic drug name is Ursodiol and it is now being widely produced under brand names such as Actigall, Urso, Ursofalk, Ursogal and Ursotan. It was estimated in 2008 that 100,000 kg of synthetic UDCA was already being used each year in China, Japan and South Korea, and that the total world consumption may be double this figure. However, many traditional doctors still consider natural (but farmed) UDCA a superior product.

In Japan, UDCA has been synthesised from cow galls, as a by-product of the meat industry, since 1955. It is also produced in the US by Ciba-Geigy.

In 2014, Kaibao Pharmaceuticals, which supplies approximately half of the bear bile (as dry powder) consumed in China, stated it is developing another synthetic source derived from poultry bile. The goal is to more closely recreate the chemistry of bear bile powder, so that the alternative is deemed appropriate by traditional Chinese medicine practitioners. In May 2024, Kaibao reported to investors that the approval process for its "artificial bear bile powder" has been delayed by recent law changes, in that additional clinical trials need to be approved and executed. Kaibao has been granted three separate Chinese patents on this topic: a 2013 application on a mixture of tauroursodeoxycholic acid with goose bile powder, a 2014 application on treating goose bile powder with 7α-HSDH and 7β-HSDH enzymes, and a 2016 application on treating goose bile powder by fermenting with a bacterium engineered to produce the two HSDH enzymes.

== Statistics ==
=== Wild population ===
The world population of Asiatic black bears decreased by 30% to 49% between 1980 and 2010. Although their reliability is unclear, range-wide estimates of 5–6,000 bears have been presented by Russian biologists. Rough density estimates without corroborating methods or data have been made in India and Pakistan, resulting in estimates of 7–9,000 in India and 1,000 in Pakistan. Unsubstantiated estimates from China give varying estimates between 15,000 and 46,000, with a government estimate of 28,000. Some estimates put the current (2015) total Asian worldwide population as low as 25,000.

=== Farmed population ===
The World Society for the Protection of Animals has been reported in 2011 as saying that more than 12,000 bears are currently estimated to be housed in both illegal and legal bear farms across Asia.

==== China ====
World Animal Protection conducted a study in 1999 and 2000, and estimated that 247 bear bile farms in China were holding 7,002 bears, though the Chinese government called the figures "pure speculation". The Chinese consider bear farms a way to reduce the demand on the wild bear population. Officially, 7,600 captive bears are farmed in China. According to Chinese officials, 10,000 wild bears would need to be killed each year to produce as much bile. The government sees farming as a reasonable answer to the loss of wild bears from poaching. However, the government's agreement to allow the rescue of 500 bears may represent a softening of this stance.

China has been found to be the main source of bear bile products on sale throughout South-East Asia; this international trade in their parts and derivatives is strictly prohibited by the Convention on International Trade in Endangered Species of Wild Fauna and Flora. In 2010, there were approximately 97 establishments in China keeping bile bears. This was a decrease from the mid-1990s, where Xinhua reported of 480 bear farms in the country.

In 2013, estimates of bears kept in cages in China for bile production range from 9,000 to 20,000 bears on nearly 100 domestic bear farms. One company (Fujian Guizhen Tang Pharmaceutical Co. Ltd) alone has more than 400 black bears to supply bile using the free drip method. The bile is harvested twice a day to collect a total of approximately 130 ml from each bear per day.

Before the existence of bear farms (i.e. pre-1980) the demand for bear bile in China was about 500 kilos annually. In 2008, the demand had risen to about 4,000 kilos annually.

==== South Korea ====
According to the South Korean Environment Ministry, 1,374 bears were raised at 74 farms across South Korea as of 2009. In South Korea, it is legal to keep bears for bile and bears older than 10 years old can be harvested for their paws and organs. In 2022, the number of bears on South Korean farms had declined to 322 animals in 20 farms. Project Moon Bear, a South Korean nongovernmental organization (NGO) has been campaigning to end bear farming in the country. In 2022, the South Korean government, associations of bear farmers, and NGOs announced a joint declaration to end bear farming by 2026.

==== Laos ====
In Laos, the first farm was established in 2000. The number of farmed bears tripled from 2008 to 2012. In 2012, there were 121 Asiatic black bears and one sun bear on 11 commercial facilities. It is possible that all the bears were wild-caught domestically, or illegally imported internationally. This is in violation of both National and International law.

In Laos in 2011, bear bile was selling for 120,000 kip (US$15) per ml, half the average monthly wage of 240,000 kip. A 2019 survey of locals in Luang Prabang found that although attitudes towards bears and conservation were generally positive, awareness of cruelty in the bear farms was lacking, with 43.7% of respondents regarding bile consumption sourced from bear farms as acceptable.

==== Vietnam ====
A 2019 survey published by the Claremont Colleges of 206 older Northern Vietnamese locals found that roughly 44% of respondents knew at least one other person who had used bear products from farms in the past year, compared to 55.33% of those who did not. 8.72% of respondents listed protecting bears as one of the reasons a person would not use such products, compared to roughly 21% who listed quality or preferring different medicine as reasons.

== Bile products ==
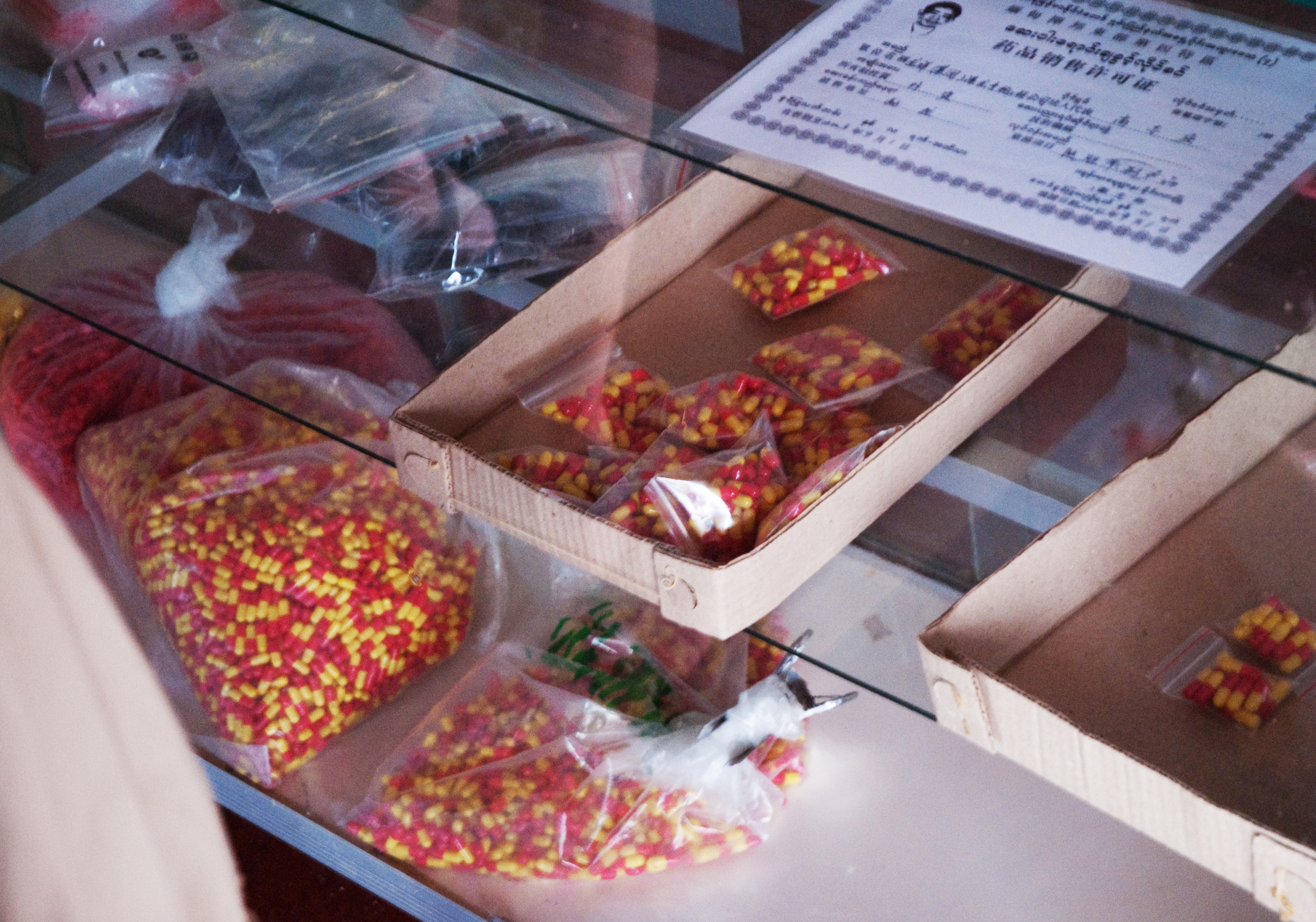
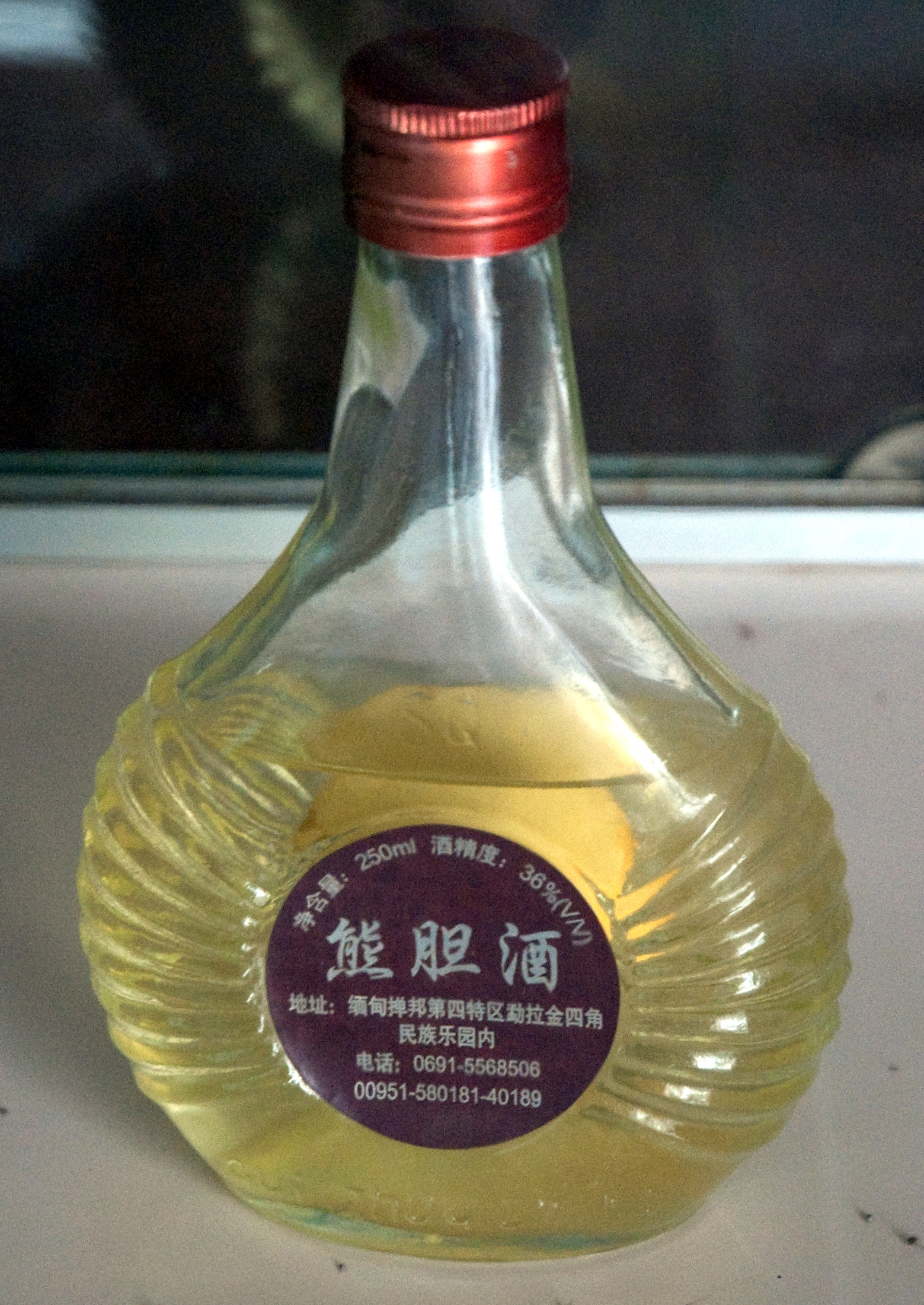
Bear bile products come in multiple forms, including pill (top) and liquid (bottom) forms.

The monetary value of the bile comes from the traditional prescription of bear bile by doctors practicing traditional medicine. Bear bile contains ursodeoxycholic acid. It is purchased and consumed to treat hemorrhoids, sore throats, sores, bruising, muscle ailments, sprains, epilepsy, reduce fever, improve eyesight, break down gallstones, act as an anti-inflammatory, reduce the effects of overconsumption of alcohol, and to 'clear' the liver. It is currently found in various forms for sale including whole gallbladders, raw bile, pills, powder, flakes, and ointment.

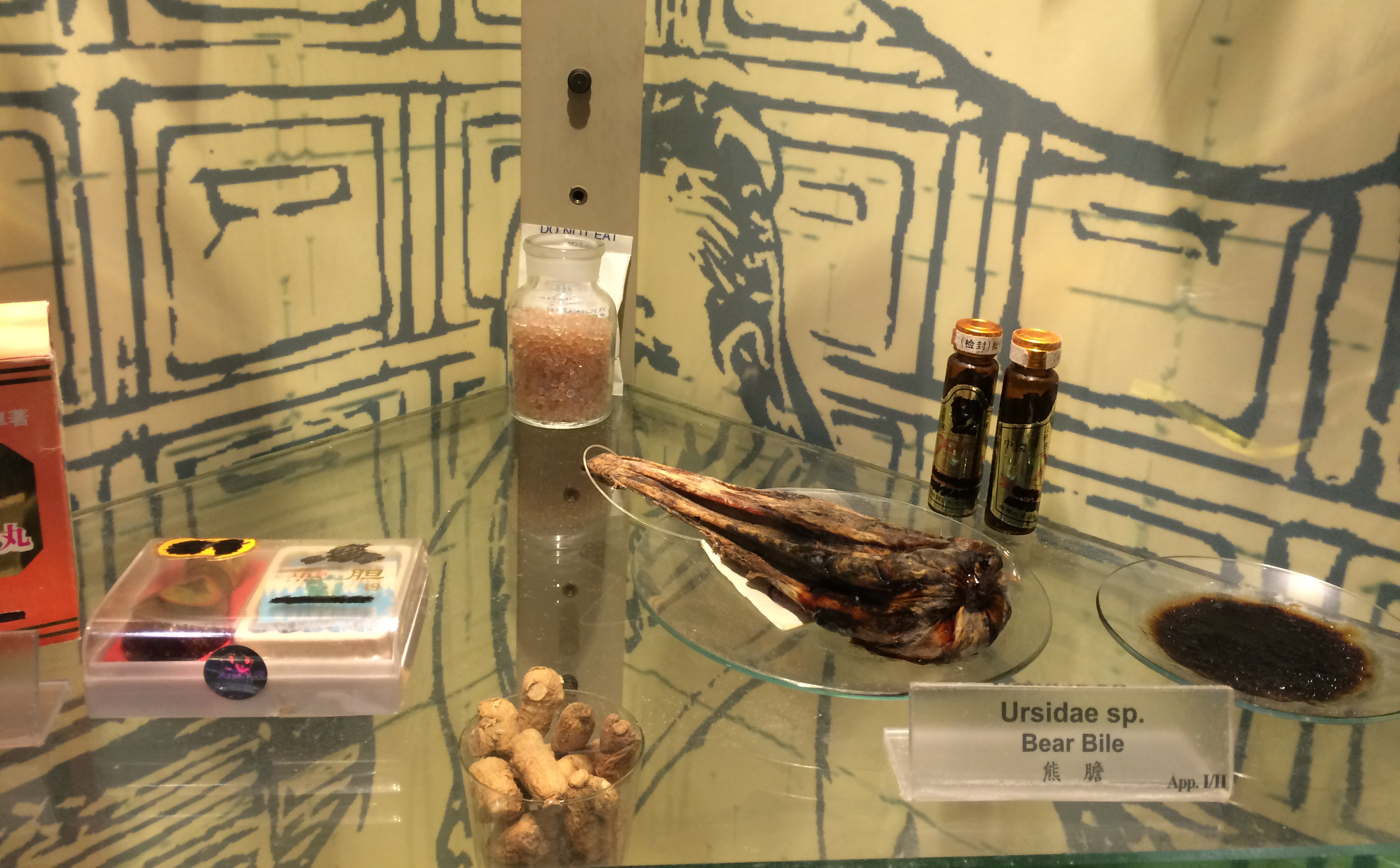
Examples of Bear Bile Products Seized by the Hong Kong Government

Because only minute amounts of bile are used in TCM, a total of 500 kg of bear bile is used by practitioners every year, but according to WSPA, more than 7,000 kg are being produced. The surplus has reportedly been used as ingredients in beauty products and non-traditional health tonics.

China's National Health Commission drew criticism in 2020 after reportedly recommending 'Tan Re Qing', a traditional medicine which contains the bile, to treat severe cases of COVID-19. Some South Korean bear bile farmers in the same year advertised that their products could also help with the coronavirus, drawing criticism from local animal rights groups.

=== Efficacy ===
Scientific studies have found components of bear bile to have some anti-inflammatory, anti-microbial, or hepatoprotective effects.

The active ingredient in bear bile is ursodeoxycholic acid. Ursodeoxycholic acid has been shown to exert anti-inflammatory and protective effects in human epithelial cells of the gastrointestinal tract. It has been linked to regulation of immunoregulatory responses by regulation of cytokines, antimicrobial peptides defensins, and take an active part in increased restitution of wound in the colon. Moreover, UDCA's effects has been shown to have exert actions outside the epithelial cells.

Bear bile has been shown in studies to be able to get rid of gallstones or dissolve them in the gallbladder.

Due to controversy around the use of bear farming to obtain bile, synthetic sources for ursodeoxycholic acid are currently being worked on and investigated. Scientists in China have been working on synthetic forms of bile products, so that scientists need not use animal sources for bile. In this way, it is hoped that in the future, bile can be created in methods that do not involve animal cruelty.

=== Cost ===
In 2011, the overall worldwide trade in bear parts, including bile, was estimated to be a $2 billion industry.

==== Gallbladder ====
In 1970, 1 kg of bear gallbladder cost approximately US$200, but by 1990 the price had risen to between US$3,000 and US$5,000 per kg. In 2009, the market price for legally sold gallbladders in Hong Kong had risen to between US$30,000 and US$50,000 per kg. It was reported in 1991 that bear gallbladders and the like could sell in Seoul "for 10 times their price in China", with prices for one ranging from US$700 to US$3,292. In 2002, the pricier bear galls in Japan were reported to be selling for as much as US$83 per gram, and were either sourced domestically, or from Tibet or China.

A report published in 2013 stated that a poacher in North America can usually get US$100 to $150 for a gallbladder, but the organs can fetch $5,000 to $10,000 in the end-market once they are processed into a powder. The report also stated that the HSUS indicated a bear gallbladder can cost more than $3,000 in Asia. A TRAFFIC report estimated that prices for whole gallbladders were as low as $51.11 (Myanmar) and as high as $2,000 (Hong Kong SAR). For gallbladder by the gram, the least expensive was $0.11 per gram (Thailand) and the highest was $109.70 per gram (Japan).

==== Raw bile and bile powder ====
Raw bile can sell for as much as US$24,000 per kg, about half the price of gold.

There is huge profitability in the trade of bile powder. In 2007, while the wholesale price of bile powder was approximately US$410 per kg in China, the retail price increased from 25 to 50 fold in South Korea, and to 80 fold in Japan, i.e. US$33,000 per kg.

==== Pills ====
Pill prices ranged from as low as $0.38 per pill (Malaysia) to $3.83 per pill (Thailand). and in the US, approximately $1 per pill, which is an average price between the two countries.

== Businesses ==
In 2010, the Guizhentang Pharmaceutical company was one of the most successful bile extraction companies in China, paying some 10 million yuan in taxes. In 2012, the company tried to go public in the Shenzhen stock exchange and proposed to triple the company's stock of captive bears, from 400 to 1,200. This provoked a large backlash from activists, internet users and protesters. It was followed by a number of controversies along with public interviews. The company responded with demonstrations of the extraction process where the bears seemed unconcerned by the procedure, in an attempt to counter the allegations its business was cruel.

== See also ==
- Animals Asia Foundation
- Free the Bears Fund
- Snake wine, a rice wine made with snake bile
