= Dog meat consumption in South Korea =

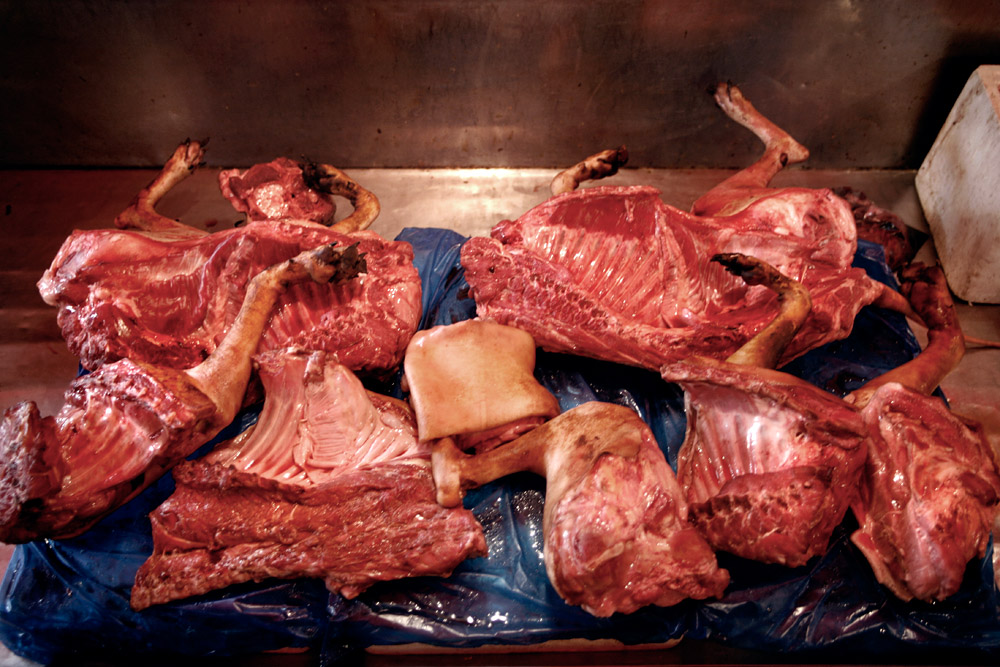
- Dog meat for sale in Gyeongdong Market in 2007

Korean name
- Hangul: 개고기
- RR: gaegogi
- MR: kaegogi

North Korean name
- Hangul: 단고기
- RR: dangogi
- MR: tan'gogi

While the consumption of dog meat is legal and practiced in South Korea, the dog meat industry is heavily restricted and soon to be illegal. On January 9, 2024, the National Assembly of South Korea unanimously passed a law banning the production and sale of dog meat, to take effect in three years. The three-year window is meant to allow dog meat farmers and vendors to adapt to the change by finding other sources of income. A 2022 survey of 1,000 South Koreans found that 78.3% had not consumed dog meat in the preceding decade, while 87.1% stated they had no intention of doing so in the future. Among those who had never consumed dog meat, the primary reasons were concern over animal cruelty (44.8%) and affection for dogs (33.7%).

While most scholars believe there is no evidence that dog meat has ever been a key part of the Korean diet, the rate of consumption, legislation, and cultural practices surrounding its consumption have changed over several thousand years. For example, during the Silla (57 BCE – 935 CE) and Goryeo (918–1392 CE) periods, the practice was uncommon as vegetarianism was advocated by Buddhism.

Consumption of dog meat has experienced a precipitous decline over the past three decades in South Korea. This has been attributed to changes in legislation, the demographic decline of the minority that consumes dog meat, and the increasing number of dogs owned as pets. Estimates of the number of animals consumed vary widely and are the subject of significant debate. Foreign media often quotes estimates of one or two million dogs consumed per year (statistics often produced by the animal rights group KARA), but some question the accuracy of the statistic. In 2020, the Ministry of Agriculture, Food and Rural Affairs reported the existence of 200 registered dog farms, although it suspected there were still unregistered farms in the country.

The largest dog meat market, Moran Market, officially shut down in 2018 following years of declining sales; however, some illegal sales were discovered in 2021. In 2018, the Taepyeong-dong complex, which served as a slaughterhouse for dogs, was closed by the South Korean government. This move came five years after a vote by the city council of Seongnam, the city where the slaughterhouse was located.

== History ==
The rate of dog meat consumption and social connotations in Korea has changed over time. Scholars widely agree that dog meat has never been a key part of the Korean diet, but it's understood to have had some role in their culture.

It is uncertain when exactly Koreans began first consuming dog meat, although many scholars trace it to the Neolithic period (6000–2000 BCE) alongside other early civilizations in East Asia. Both Korean and Western scholars suggest that there is archaeological evidence of dog bones from this period that display signs of dog meat consumption. Some scholars also argue the use of dog skins and furs, as well as evidence of dogs being used as companion animals. A wall painting in the Goguryeo tombs complex in South Hwanghae Province, North Korea, a UNESCO World Heritage site dating from the 4th century CE, depicts a slaughtered dog.

During the Silla (57 BCE – 935 CE) and Goryeo (918–1392 CE) dynasties, the practice was uncommon, as Buddhism was the state religion of both nations. During the Goryeo Dynasty, eating meat was generally discouraged. During the Joseon Dynasty certain government officials argued that dogs were human companions and advocated a ban on the consumption of dog meat.

During the Joseon period (1392–1897), there is evidence that dog meat was seen as somewhat of a delicacy, although it was still not widely consumed. Some people reserved its consumption for special days, including hot days in the summer, funerals, and hwangap celebrations (sixtieth birthday celebrations historically considered important). According to Goundangpilgi (고운당필기) by Yu Deuk-gong, published in 1783, those who ate dog meat were considered irreverent and prohibited from approaching ginseng farms, indicating that some people at the time also regarded dog meat as unclean. Around 1816, a son of prominent scholar Chŏng Yagyong wrote a poem called Nonggawŏllyŏngga (농가월령가) that described seasonal practices of rural populations. He described a woman serving boiled dog meat, among other foods, to the parents of her husband. The 1849 book Dongguksesigi contains a recipe for the dog meat dish bosintang.

Some people have historically associated Sambok, the three hottest days of summer according to the Korean calendar (lunisolar), with the consumption of bosintang, a dog meat-based dish, although this practice is increasingly rare.

== Recent history ==
In 2019, fewer than 100 restaurants served dog meat in Seoul (out of over 520,000 restaurants in Greater Seoul), and the numbers have continued to decline each year. Some restaurants are reporting declines in consumption of 20–30% per year. A 2022 Chosun Ilbo report found that customers of the dog meat market tended to be foreigners or elderly (above 70 years old).

By 2019 all major dog meat markets had shut down across South Korea, mainly due to declining sales. In 2021, the last major dog meat market remaining shut down in Daegu.

On November 21, 2018, South Korea closed the country's main dog slaughterhouse, known as Taepyeong-dong. The slaughterhouse was located in Seongnam. The Seongnam city council, which voted in 2013 to close the slaughterhouse, planned to turn the area into a community park.

Most Korean Buddhists consider eating any kind of meat or dairy as a moral offense. Catholic South Koreans tend to consume dog meat at a higher frequency than other religions in South Korea. In general, the rise of Christianity has contributed to the rise in meat consumption of all types throughout East Asia.

While the consumption of dog meat has declined greatly, the excess of dogs from puppy mills of the pet industry and the growing population of dogs in shelters have emerged as much greater problems. During the 2010s there were repeated campaigns by Korean animal welfare and government agencies to adopt abandoned and mixed-breed dogs.

In 2022, the Ministry for Food, Agriculture, Forestry and Fisheries of South Korea published a first official report called "Edible dog breeding and distribution survey". The report states that 521,121 dogs are reared in 1,156 dog meat farms and 388,000 dogs are consumed in 1,666 restaurants per year, as of February 2022. According to the "Public Perception Survey on Dog Eating", 55.8% of respondents said that society should stop eating dogs, while 28.4% of respondents answered that it should remain legal. As for the legalization of dog slaughter, 52.7% of respondents were against it and 39.2% were in favor of it. About 85.5% of respondents said they do not currently eat dog meat, and 14.1% said they do.

In December 2023 there were scuffles between the police and dozens of dog farmers who were protesting after the ruling party agreed to introduce new legislation to ban the practice of dog meat consumption by the end of the year. Dog farmers from the Korea Dog Meat Farmers' Association indicated that they were considering releasing two million dogs near lawmakers' homes and landmarks belonging to the government in Seoul.

In January 2024 the South Korean government passed a law banning the sale and production of dog meat. The law will only be enforced in 2027 following a three-year grace period. Violators of the law could face up to three years in prison, or a maximum fine of 30 million won.

South Korea will assist in rehoming nearly half a million dogs bred for food, as part of preparations for a dog meat ban set to take effect in 2027. The government will also provide subsidies and incentives to support dog farmers in transitioning away from the practice, according to the Agriculture Ministry.

== Breeds ==
The primary dog breed raised for meat is a non-specific landrace commonly named as Nureongi (누렁이), or Hwanggu (황구). Nureongi are not the only type of dog currently slaughtered for their meat in South Korea. In 2015, The Korea Observer reported that many different pet breeds of dog are bred to be eaten, including, for example, labradors, retrievers, and cocker spaniels, and that the dogs slaughtered for their meat often include former pets. Humane Society International/Korea has been working cooperatively with dog farmers since 2015 to help them close their farms, and rehome the dogs. As of August 2020, HSI has closed down 16 dog meat farms and "rescued" more than 2,000 dogs. The charity documents every farm closure to show the conditions, and it is clear that all breeds of dog are found on these facilities including golden retrievers, beagles, poodles and huskies alongside tosas and jindos.

The prior practice has been to slaughter the dogs by electrocution, though some were hung or beaten over the head before exsanguination. Such practices are illegal under the 2007 Animal Protection Act and have become increasingly rare.

== Legal status ==
Between 1975 and 1978, dogs had the full legal status of livestock animals in South Korea, but the legality of the dog meat trade is now highly disputed. South Korea adopted its first Animal Protection Law in May 1991.

Currently, Article 7 of the Animal Protection Act does not explicitly prohibit the slaughter of dogs for food, but rather "prohibits killing animals in a brutal way". In addition, it "forbids killing the dogs in open areas such as on the street or in front of other animals of the same species".

Dog meat is subject to the Food Sanitation Act/Food Hygiene Act of 1962, which simply defines food as "all foodstuff, except taken as medicine". Unlike beef, pork, or poultry, dog meat is excluded from the list of livestock under the Livestock Processing Act of 1962, (Note: In August 1975, the Ministry of Agriculture and Forestry (now the Ministry for Food, Agriculture, Forestry and Fisheries) included dog in the legal definition of livestock under the Ministerial Ordinance of the LPA (then the Livestock Hygienic Treatment Act). But in June 1978, "dog" was deleted from the list of livestock. (Kim, R. 2008)) which is "the principal statute governing hygienic slaughtering of livestock and processing of meat". Hence, dog meat farming is under-regulated compared to that of other stock animals.

As a result, there are no regulations requiring the humane slaughter of dogs for meat, though the treatment of dogs falls under animal cruelty laws. The controversy over dog meat often centers on the slaughtering methods employed, which include electrocution, strangulation by hanging, and beating the dog to death. According to reports from 1999, some dogs were still alive when they were blow-torched or thrown into boiling water to remove their fur. In more recent decades, such practices are prosecuted by law.

In 2008, the Seoul Metropolitan Government proposed a recommendation to the national government to add dogs to the list of livestock whose slaughter is regulated by law. Activist groups opposed the proposal as legitimizing or legalizing the trade in dog meat. The city dropped the proposal, but an official from the national government was quoted as saying "It's the sole idea of the city. We have not been consulted at all ... I don't think we are planning to even consider this option."

In June 2018, the municipal court of the city of Bucheon ruled that killing dogs for their meat was illegal. The landmark decision came after much criticism from animal advocates in the country. The court case was brought forward by animal rights group Coexistence of Animal Rights on Earth (Care) against a dog farm, which they said "was killing animals without a real reason".

On September 27, 2021, South Korean President Moon Jae-in raised the possibility of a ban on dog meat consumption in the country.

On November 17, 2023, the ruling People Power Party declared their plans for a ban of the consumption of dog meat in the country. If the proposed bill was enacted by the end of the year, dog meat would have been prohibited by 2027. Lawmaker Yu Eui-dong stated that they would "provide full support to farmers, butchers and other businesses facing closure or transition" from the law.

On January 9, 2024, the National Assembly of Korea passed a law criminalizing the raising or slaughtering of dogs for consumption and the sale and distribution of dog meat, effective 2027.

According to the bill, those who violate the law by raising and butchering dogs will be subject to a maximum three-year prison term or a fine of up to 30 million won ($22,768), while those distributing dog meat can face up to two years behind bars or a maximum fine of 20 million won.

== Types of dishes ==
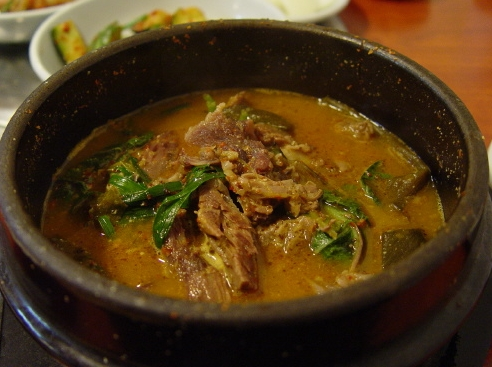
Bosintang

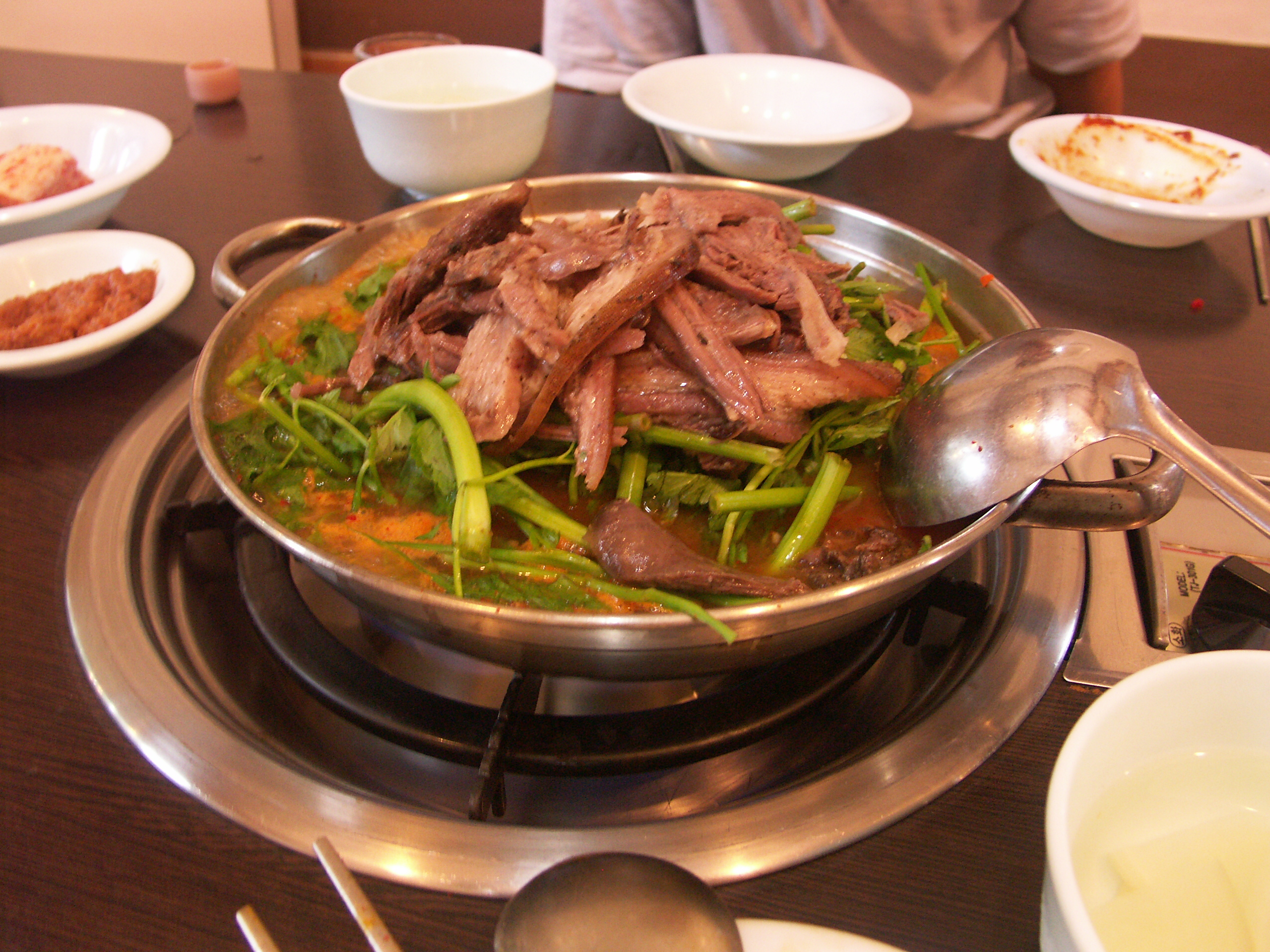
Gaegogi Jeongol

- Bosintang (보신탕; 補身湯); gaejangguk (개장국) Stew containing boiled dog meat and vegetables.
- Gaegogi Jeongol (개고기 전골) – An elaborate dog stew made in a large Jeongol pan.
- Gae Suyuk (개 수육; 개水肉) – Boiled dog meat
- Gaegogi Muchim (개고기 무침) – Steamed dog meat, Korean leeks (부추), and vegetables mixed with spices
- Gaesoju (개소주; 개燒酒) – Mixed drink containing dog meat and other Chinese medicine ingredients such as ginger, chestnut, and jujube to invigorate one's health.

== International attention ==
In 1984, preceding the 1988 Summer Olympics in Seoul, the South Korean government banned the sale of dog meat within the four gates of downtown Seoul. In 2001, prior to the 2002 FIFA World Cup, the organizers of the games, under pressure from animal rights groups such as PETA, demanded that the South Korean government re-address the issue. Brigitte Bardot, head of La Fondation Brigitte Bardot, launched a campaign during the 2002 FIFA World Cup to have dog meat outlawed in South Korea and encouraged a boycott of the games unless a ban took place. Bardot was in turn heavily critiqued and ridiculed for being extremely rude and condescending in her public interactions, which included calling South Koreans "savage people" and hanging up on reporters during televised interviews.

In October 2018, a leading Egyptian MP (Margaret Azer) suggested that Egypt export stray dogs for meat consumption to countries like South Korea as a solution to the problem of overpopulation of stray dogs in the country. Azer's statements sparked a wave of criticism among animal rights advocates and rescuers in Egypt, although no such plans were ever proven to be in place. This statement was made when major dog meat markets had already shut down in South Korea due to lack of demand.

South Korean migrant workers living abroad and diaspora children have faced discrimination, bullying, and racism due to the stereotype of South Koreans eating dog meat. Such actions have persisted, even though eating dog meat is not a widespread practice in South Korea. In 2021, Park Ji-Sung, a fan-favorite former soccer player for Manchester United, asked the soccer club's fans to stop singing a song in his honor that includes the stereotype that South Koreans eat dog meat.

Asian Americans, including Korean Americans, have for many decades been subjected to stereotypes of South Koreans and other Asians as dog eaters. An example is TV host Jay Leno, who had repeatedly recycled stereotypes of South Koreans eating dog meat in his jokes. In one instance, during the 2002 Winter Olympics, Jay Leno joked that the South Korean Olympic short-track skater Kim Dong-Sung would eat his dog. The MCIC Group filed a class-action lawsuit against Leno on behalf of 50,000 Korean Americans, demanding an apology and monetary damages. Jay Leno finally apologized in 2021 for decades of making racist jokes.

Amidst the decline in dog meat consumption in contemporary South Korea, a vocal group in South Korea has critiqued the international outcry toward dog meat consumption as being hypocritical. International animal rights activists have noted the hypocrisy, as well, given the horrific conditions under which factory farmed animals are raised in the West. Some South Korean citizens, as well as members of the international community, have pointed out that the nations from which most of the outcry has emerged have the highest per capita meat consumption on the planet, several-fold higher than that of South Korea.

== Controversy ==
In South Korea, a minority of people regularly consume dog meat, predominantly as Bosintang (lit. 'body protecting soup'), which is thought to have medicinal properties. Consuming dog meat is also a minority practice in China.

In 2020, Nielsen Online Research conducted two surveys of 1,000 people from June to September. From the survey, 84% of South Koreans stated that they have never consumed dog meat and had no plans to consume it in the future. 59% supported the ban on dog meat, and 57% said that consumption of dog meat had an effect on creating negative perceptions of South Korea. Humane Society International said: "Most Koreans do not consume dog meat, and a growing population recognizes dogs as companion animals, not edible."

The animal welfare advocacy group Animal Welfare Institute has called for letters of protest about the dog meat trade to be sent to the South Korean president and ambassador to the United States prior to South Korea hosting the 2018 Winter Olympics. The charity World Dog Alliance raised a successful online petition in 2012 calling for the UK Government to intervene and oppose the cruelty. In 2015, the issue was finally debated in the House of Commons Chamber. A second debate on South Korea's dog meat trade in the UK Parliament was held on September 12, 2016, by the Petitions Committee, following an online petition which was started on petition.parliament.uk. Change.org has over 450,000 signatures on a petition to boycott the 2018 Winter Olympics. In 2018 Humane Society International/Korea, Korea Animal Rights Advocates (KARA), and petition site Care2 hand-delivered a petition of 1 million signatures to the President's residence, the Blue House, in Seoul, with a letter urging him to initiate a phase-out of dog meat farms.

A 2019 study found that farmed dogs had over twice as high levels of cortisol in hair compared pet dogs, suggesting that dogs on meat farms experience "chronic physiological stress".

== Political debate ==
From the late 2010s, South Korean liberals, including Democratic Party and Justice Party, began actively questioning dog meat culture. As a result, there is a severe conflict between the views of the liberal camp and the conservative camp in South Korea. Liberals who confront Confucian social conservatism in South Korea, criticize dog meat culture as immoral. President Moon Jae-in said he was even considering a legal ban on dog meat on September 28, 2021. Moon's view gained strong support from animal rights groups. Shortly after Moon's remarks on dog meat, People Power Party spokesman Yang Joon-woo strongly criticized Moon, saying, "The state does not have the right to regulate individual tastes or eating habits". In addition, Yoon Suk Yeol, who later became president of South Korea, criticized South Korea's liberal camp on November 2, 2021, saying that "pet dog" and "eating dogs" should be distinguished. Politician Ahn Cheol-soo pledged to gradually ban dog meat eating during the 2017 South Korean presidential election.

== See also ==
- Animal welfare and rights in South Korea
- Anti-Korean sentiment
- Dog meat
- Dog meat consumption in Nigeria
- Dog meat consumption in Vietnam
- Dog Meat Festival in China
- Nureongi
- Taboo food and drink
