= Jill Robinson =

British animal welfare activist

Jill Robinson MBE
- Born: Jill Robinson; England, United Kingdom
- Occupation: Founder/CEO for Animals Asia
- Website: www.animalsasia.org/intl/social/jills-blog

Jill Robinson MBE is an English animal welfare activist. She is the founder of Animals Asia Foundation.

== Biography ==
Born and raised in England, Robinson was always interested in the welfare of animals. As a child she volunteered in veterinary offices during her school holidays. In the mid-1980s she moved to Hong Kong, where she began working for the International Fund for Animal Welfare, focusing on work in China and South Korea.

In 1993, Robinson visited a bear bile farm in China. According to Robinson, at the time approximately 10,000 Asiatic black bears were caged at farms similar to this one, in conditions many animal welfare groups consider horrific. At bear bile farms, bile is extracted from the bear's gallbladder for use in traditional Chinese medicines. According to the World Wide Fund for Nature, only about 15,000–20,000 Asiatic black bears are alive in the wild in China, which would qualify them for the highest protection described by the Convention on International Trade in Endangered Species. Chinese authorities estimate that over 50,000 of the bears live in the wild, which would eliminate the necessity for higher protection.

Professor Peter Li believes that Robinson "single-handedly alerted the world" to the cruel practice of bear farming. For the next seven years, Robinson researched the way bile was used and negotiated with the Chinese government. In 2000, the Sichuan Forestry Department signed a pledge with the China Wildlife Conservation Association to release 500 bears from the bile farms with the worst conditions. This marked the first time an agency of the Chinese government had come to an official agreement with an animal welfare organization. To house the released bears, Robinson founded Animals Asia Foundation and established a bear rescue center in Chengdu. The foundation has since established a similar sanctuary in Vietnam, where there are also hundreds of bear bile farms.

In April 2014, representing Animals Asia, Robinson announced plans to convert a bear bile farm with over 130 Asiatic black bears in Nanning, China, into an animal sanctuary. The farm was part of Flower World, a state-owned horticulture and landscaping company.

In 2017, Robinson announced an MOU alongside the Deputy General Director of the Vietnam Administration of Forestry, Cao Chi Cong, to end bear bile farming in Vietnam by 2020 and to work together to rescue the remaining 1,000 bears still in cages.

Robinson has also been a proponent of the Doctor Dog program, which rescues stray dogs in Asia and trains them to participate in animal-assisted therapy.

== Awards ==
Jill Robinson has received numerous distinctions for her commitment to animal welfare, including:

- 2025 - Explorers Club 50 (EC50)
- 2002 - Genesis Award;
- in 2005 - the Reader's Digest Hero for Today Award; and
- in 1998 - MBE by Queen Elizabeth in the Birthday Honours List, in recognition of her services to animal welfare in Asia.
- In 2018 - Robinson was noted in the book, Rescuing Ladybugs by author and animal advocate Jennifer Skiff as having "ignited a movement in Asia" after being physically and emotionally touched by an imprisoned moon bear being used for bile extraction in Zhuhai, China.

== See also ==
- Bear bile
- Animals Asia Foundation
