= Korea Animal Rights Advocates =

Animal welfare organization in Korea

- Abbreviation: KARA
- Type: Non-profit
- Purpose: Animal welfare
- Headquarters: Seoul, South Korea
- Region served: South Korea
- Official language: Korean
- Executive Director: Yim Soon-rye
- Website: www.ekara.org

Korea Animal Rights Advocates (KARA) is a non-profit organization that supports animal welfare in Korea and deals with animal cruelty cases. It is also responsible for the care of abandoned animals and their adoption.

== History ==
The organization was founded in 2002 under the name of Arumppom by a group of reformers. In 2006, it was officially registered as a non-profit organization and renamed KARA. KARA was registered as an incorporated association to the Korean Ministry of Agriculture and Forestry in 2010. The current KARA Executive Director is the Korean movie director Yim Soon-rye.

== Programs and Campaigns ==
=== Animal Welfare Education Center ===
In 2014, KARA established the Animal Welfare Education Center. The purpose of the Center is to improve animal welfare issues through educational programs. This is also the head office of the society, and handles calls and manages activities and tasks.

=== Animal Rights Campaigns ===
KARA campaigns for animal welfare issues in Korea such as animal testing, animal shows, dog meat consumption and the use of fur. Through legislative campaigns, it also works for stricter enforcement and revision of the Animal Protection Act. In order to raise public awareness about animal protection, the society conducts various activities in which artists are engaged, such as photo exhibitions.

=== Trap-neuter-return ===
Trap-neuter-return is one of KARA’s main projects used to control feral cat population growth and eventually to improve the lives of feral cats. Cats are humanely trapped and taken to be neutered, then returned to their home after recovery.

=== Abandoned Pet Support & Adoption Projects ===
KARA’s adoption center handles the work of rescuing, protecting and caring for abandoned pets, until their adoption.

=== Volunteer Project ===
The KARA Volunteer Project supports private no-kill shelters in Korea, which are run by individuals, without governmental funding. They visit shelters with poor conditions monthly and provide them with food and services such as neutering surgery, kennel repair, and medical care.

== See also ==
- Animal welfare and rights in South Korea
