= Grandview Mall Aquarium =

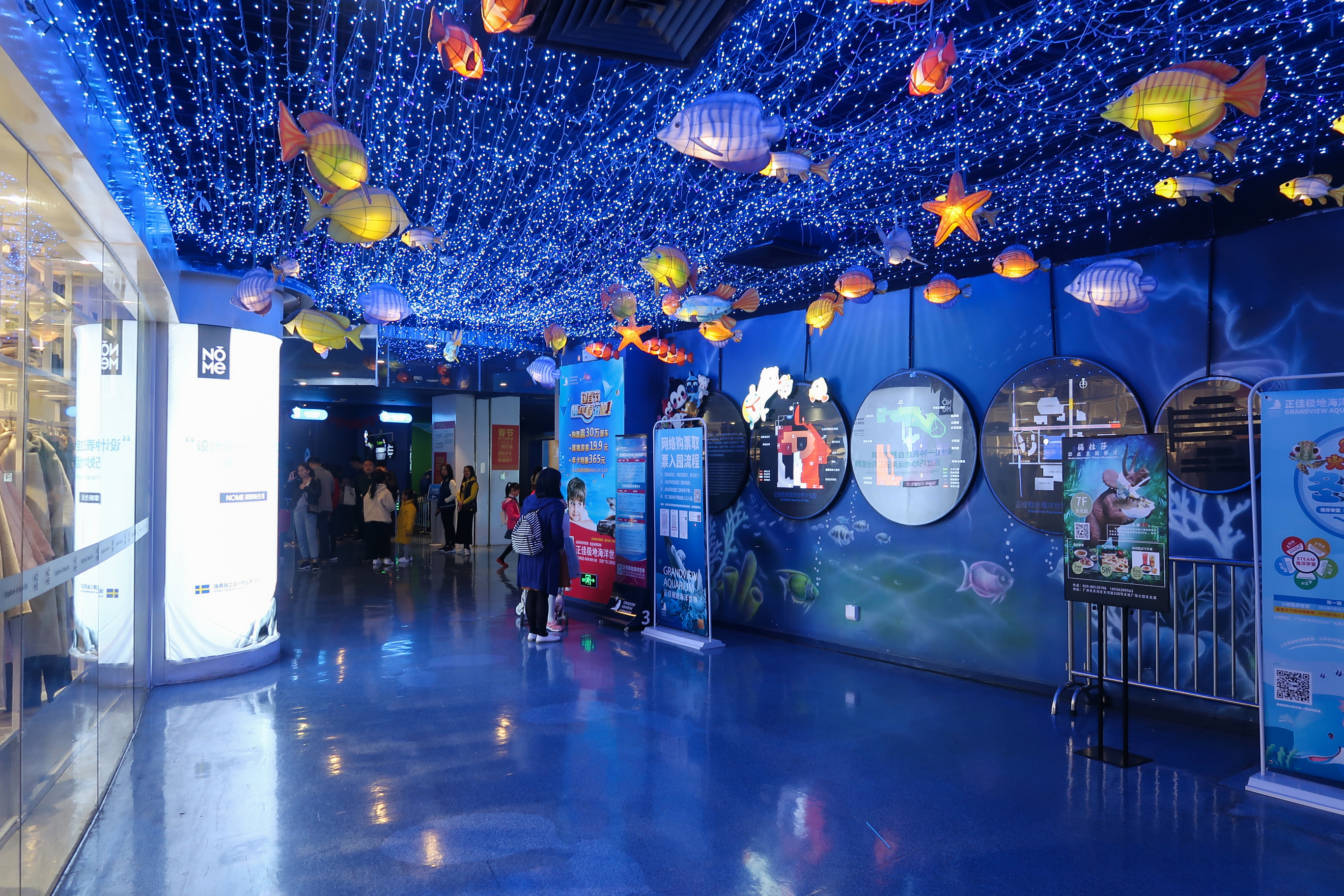
- Aquarium entrance in 2019
- Date opened: January 9, 2016
- Location: Tianhe Road and Tiyu Road East; Guangzhou, Guangdong Province, China
- Volume of largest tank: 270 cubic meters
- Website: http://www.grandviewaquarium.com/

The Grandview Mall Aquarium, also known as "The Ocean World," is on the second floor of Grandview Shopping Mall (Zhengjia Square) in the city of Guangzhou, Guangdong Province, China. The aquarium is considered one of the longest in a shopping mall in China. The main tank in the aquarium is approximately 30 meters long, 3 meters wide and 3 meters high. Over 2000 fish, 200 sting rays, 30 sharks are housed within. The aquarium also includes mammals, such as the arctic fox, polar bear, walrus, beluga, and others.

== Animal abuse ==
In early 2016, Animals Asia Foundation (AAF) began campaigning for the release and closure of the aquarium due to poor conditions. The organization have issued online petitions that have reached over 400,000 signatures and counting calling for the closure of the themepark.

=== Pizza the polar bear ===
On March 17, 2016, AAF released a video of a male polar bear, 'Pizza', in his enclosure at the theme park. The video appears to show the bear lying on his side and crying due to his entrapment in the unnatural environment. The video was viewed over 600,000 times. Pizza has been deemed the "world's saddest polar bear" due to the inhumane conditions of the theme park, as shown in the highly publicized video. A petition called for the bear's relocation to Yorkshire Wildlife Park.

As a result, the aquarium was put under renovation. In November 2016, the Grandview Mall Aquarium announced Pizza would be moved temporarily to upgrade and optimize his living conditions. Animal rights activists applauded the aquarium's move and are still working towards the bear's release.

== See also ==
- Animal welfare and rights in China
