= NoToDogMeat =

British animal rights charity

NoToDogMeat is a UK-based animal rights charity which supports rescue centres in countries which have a dog meat and cat meat trade. The charity, which is legally known as World Protection for Dogs and Cats in the Meat Trade, also campaigns against the killing of pet animals in the fur trade. NoToDogMeat operates around the world.

== About ==
The charity was started by Julia de Cadenet, after she witnessing the dog meat trade on a 2009 trip to China. She began campaigning under the group name "NoToDogMeat" after returning to London.

As well as continued lobbying, the charity works directly with shelters in China to rescue dogs and cats that are destined for the meat trade.

Some of the dogs from the rescue centres are rehomed in China, while others travel abroad.

As of 2021 the charity also has a shelter in Cambodia, which is managed by local people in partnership with NoToDogMeat.

NoToDogMeat also carries out regular vigils and protests outside the embassies of countries which still have a dog and cat meat trade, and lobbies governments directly for change.

NoToDogMeat is a vegetarian organisation and has thousands of active supporters around the world.

The charity has grassroots supporters around the world who take part in fundraising activities for NoToDogMeat, including the London Marathon.

== Campaigns and major publicity ==
The charity World Protection for Dogs and Cats in the Meat Trade (a subsidiary of NoToDogMeat) was legally formed on May 24, 2013 and was placed on the UK Charity Commission register in November.

The charity says it is committed to helping rescuers who stop trucks on the way to the Dog Meat Festival as well as raiding markets and slaughterhouses.

In January 2018 World Protection for Dogs and Cats in the Meat Trade was recommended for Special Consultative Status.

In 2015, a New York Times exposé expressed concerns from campaigners that a Chinese woman named Ms. Yang - who was, at the time, the subject of one of the charity's campaigns - was misappropriating funds, and treating the animals in her care poorly. These claims were backed up by 46 organisations in China including Dr Peter Li, China specialist for HSI.

NoToDogMeat had raised funds for Mrs Yang, but after travelling to see for themselves what was going on, diverted the money to other deserving shelters.

In May 2021 NoToDogMeat broke news that new rules in Yulin around the live slaughter of animals could put an end to the festival for good.

However, NotoToDogMeat campaigners spotted trucks full of dogs headed for the festival in the days leading up to the event.

Inside Yulin the festival was being policed, and no public slaughter was taking place, however dogs were on the menu.
