= Dog meat consumption in Vietnam =

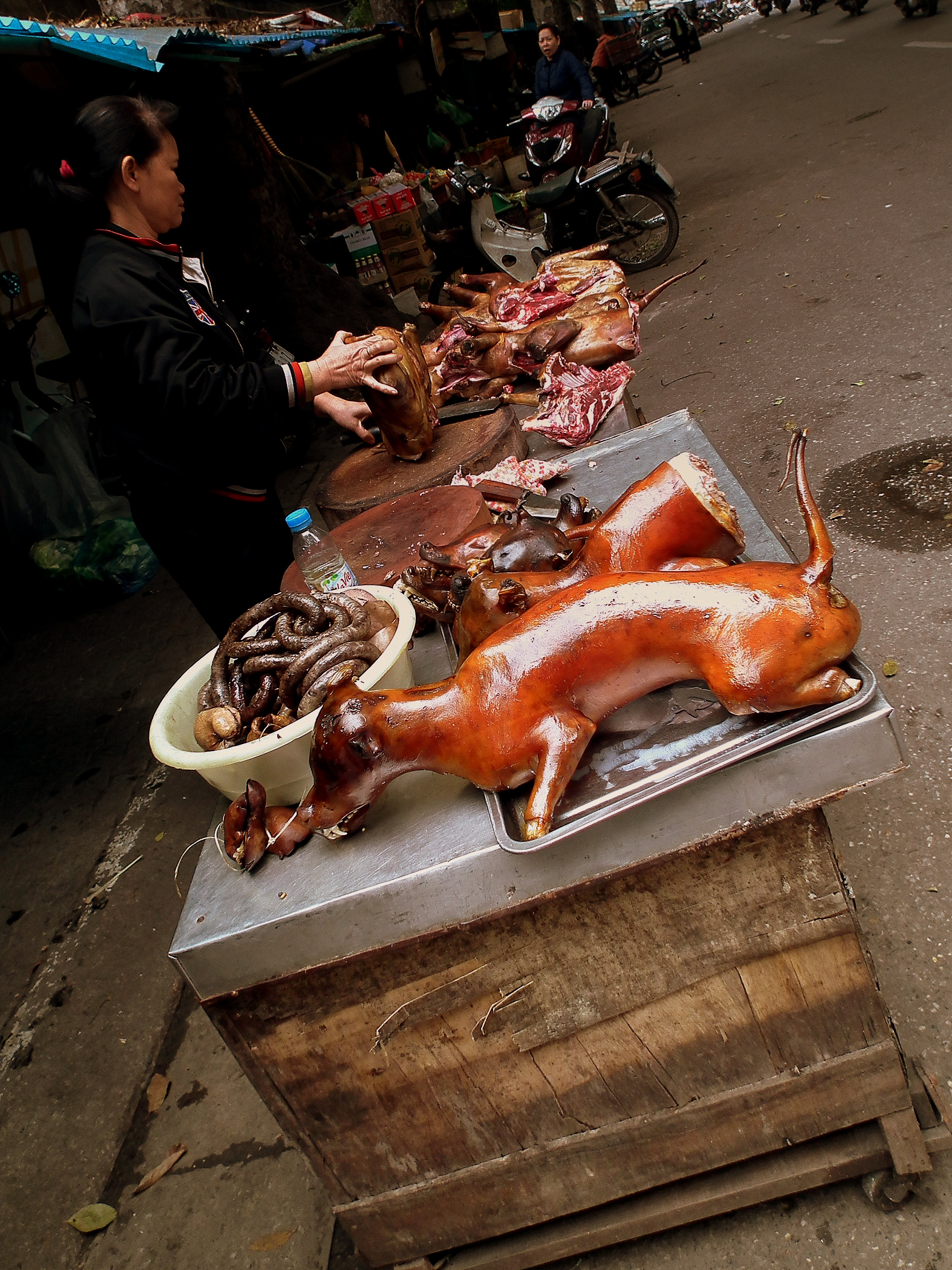
Dog meat for sale in a market in Hanoi, Vietnam

Dog meat consumption is legal in Vietnam.

According to the Four Paws February 2020 report on the dog and cat meat trade in Southeast Asian countries, roughly 5 million dogs are killed for their meat each year in Vietnam. Although the report indicated that Vietnam is the second biggest consumer of dog meat, it wrote that 40% of those surveyed have eaten dog meat.

Today, the majority of Vietnam's population do not consume dog meat, and the practice is on a continuous trend of decline. In a 2021 survey, around 91% of respondents wanted dog meat to be banned. 95% of respondents also answered that dog meat consumption is not a part of Vietnamese culture. Debate over dog meat consumption in Vietnam has become more frequent. This increased debate has been impacted by animal activists in and out of the country where dogs are traditionally worshiped according to folk customs and religions, and according to Buddhist belief where animals are strictly prohibited from being harmed.

== Early history ==
There are relatively few records about the early domestication of dogs in Vietnam. Evidence of dog domestication has been found at the Neolithic settlement of An Son that may be traced back to 2100 BC. The site is located close to the northern border of Long An province in the southern part of the country. It is suggested that the early inhabitants maintained domestic dogs and pigs at the site. In northern Vietnam, a few domestic dog remains were found at the Man Bac site. Similar to pig domestication, butcher marks were observed on the abundance of dog remains at the site, indicating that dogs were a source of food for the inhabitants. More dog remains than pig remains were found at the site. There was no evidence of special treatment of dogs such as burial that would indicate human-dog emotional ties.

== Cultural beliefs ==
=== Spiritual worship ===
Cultural beliefs about dogs are usually connected to the role that dogs play in the household and the emotional connections between dogs and humans. Cultural beliefs also shape the tradition of consuming dog meat.

The early nineteenth-century poem "The Quarrel of the Six Beasts" gives a glimpse of the dog's household position through its food. In the poem, the animals are arguing about which animal is most useful by comparing their jobs and the food they eat. The dog in the story claims that it sometimes gets "crumbs of rice and dregs of soup" from the master, but often eats low-quality food such as "rotten taro and wormy yam." In fact, in Intage Vietnam's report about pet care, 9% of the population fed their dogs with leftovers in 2019.

The guard role of dogs transitioned into the worshiping of them. Vietnamese folk culture holds that placing stone dogs in front of temples and houses will drive away ghosts and devils. For example, in Hanoi, dogs were worshiped at the Puppy Temple by Truc Bach lake that may date back to 1010.

The worship of dogs has also been popular among ethnic minorities. The Tay people would counterbalance the bad feng shui in a house by placing a stone dog in the front yard. It is believed that dog sculptures possess blessings. The stone dogs are also connected to the sacred creature nghê, a lion dog. The Dao people believe that they are the descendants of the dog god, Panhu. This makes dog meat forbidden in their culture.

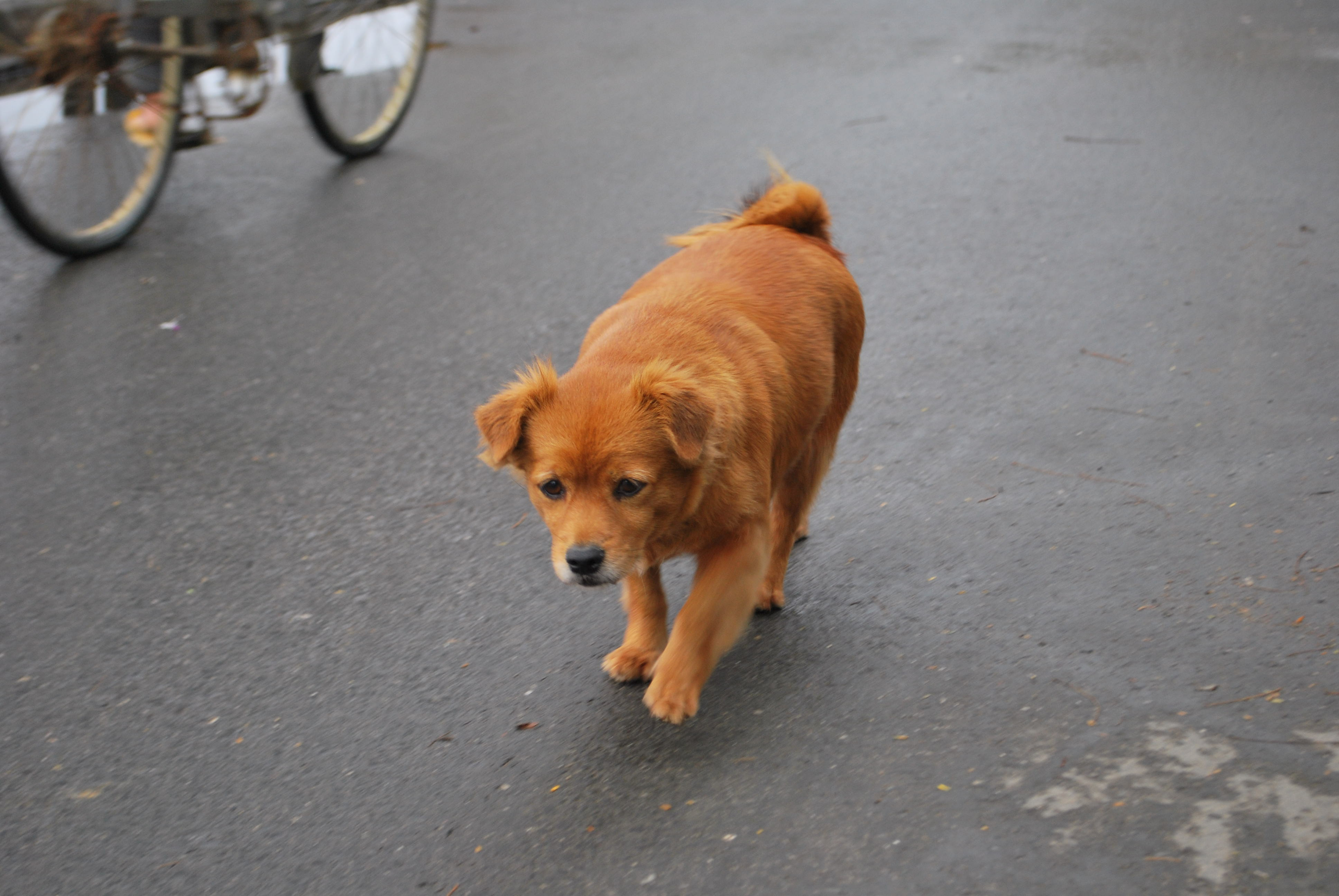
A Hoi An street dog

Dog worship is one of the oldest Vietnamese folk traditions where dogs were praised as being the most loyal protectors. The saying "feed a man for 3 years and he'll forget you in 3 seconds while if you feed a dog for 3 days he'll remember you forever" is an old adage representing how dogs were considered defenders of a family home.

== Modern trends ==
After recovering from the 1997 Asian financial crisis, the Vietnamese economy returned to rapid growth by 2004, with the continued influx of foreign direct investment.

In 1999, only a couple of places served dog meat. It was mentioned that dog meat restaurants were "in [a] maze of alleys" or "outside the town." In addition, instead of writing "Thịt Chó" on the signs, a more obscure expression "Thịt Cầy" (lit. 'civet meat') was used. In 2004, more restaurants were visible with the name "Thịt Chó".

=== Expanding pet market ===
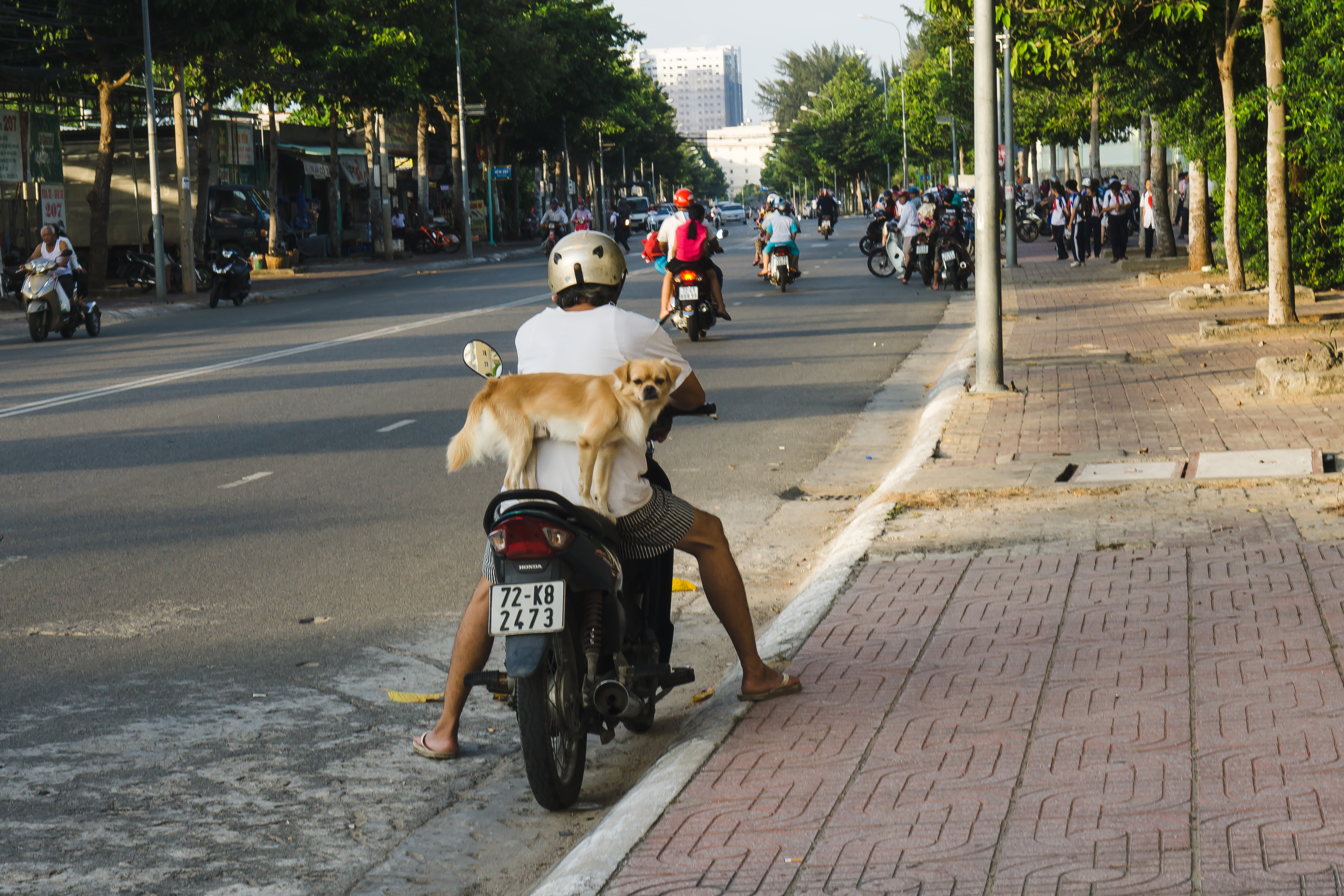
A dog as a companion

The first commercial pet shop opened in Ho Chi Minh City in 2006, and within 8 years, pet shops expanded in number and availability in different cities. Furthermore, luxurious grooming services have been offered to pet owners in cities.

Vietnamese pet retailers often run a cash-based business which makes analysis of the industry harder. Although little scholarly analysis has focused on the potential influence of the expanding pet care industry on dog consumption, there is enough evidence to indicate that the pet care market is on the rise.

This change might be brought on by the increasingly important concept of companion animals. An interview conducted with a clinic owner in Vietnam shows pet owners' increased willingness to spend more money on their pets.

=== Legal status ===
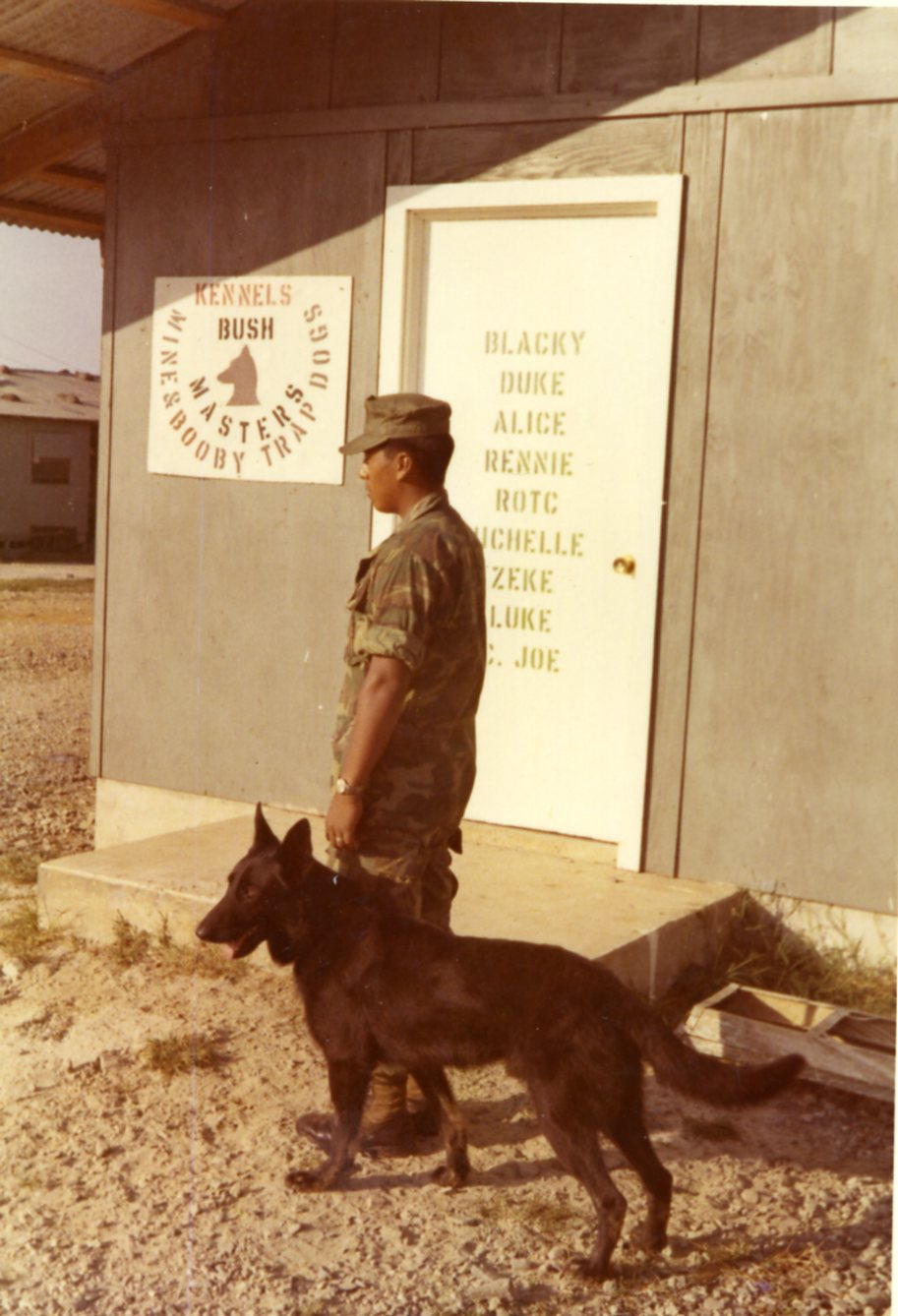
War dog, Vietnam, c. 1970

Vietnamese pet owners together with activists from other nations are advocating for banning the sale and trade of dog meat. As of 2023, the Soi Dog Foundation is collecting 1.5 million signatures to submit a petition to ban dog meat to the Communist Party of Vietnam. In the petition, China's progress on forbidding the trade of cat, dog and wildlife meat is mentioned. Legislation provides pet owners some protection over pet theft. In July 2016, a law was amended to enable prosecutions against thieves whose crimes cause social disorder.

More recently, in 2018, a statement was issued by the director of the Hanoi Department of Animal Health stating that raising public awareness of the risks of dog meat consumption needed to be strengthened to discourage the practice, and that the dog meat trade would be eliminated from the city's central 21 districts by 2021. In 2019, the Food Safety Management Board in Ho Chi Minh City urged people to stop consuming dog meat.

=== Controversy and debate ===
NGOs such as Four Paws have promoted that globalized developments such as transnational tourism have created pressure for a shift in Vietnam.

== See also ==
- Dog meat
- Dog meat consumption in Nigeria
- Dog meat consumption in South Korea
