= Guizhentang Pharmaceutical Company =

Chinese pharmaceutical company

Guizhentang Pharmaceutical company
- Romanized name: Fújiàn Guīzhēntáng Yàoyè Gǔfèn Yǒuxiàn Gōngsī
- Founded: December 18, 2000; 25 years ago
- Headquarters: Quanzhou, Fujian, People's Republic of China
- Number of locations: Hui'an County
- Website: www.gztxd.com

Guizhentang Pharmaceutical company (Chinese: 福建归真堂药业股份有限公司), known by the short name of Guizhentang (Chinese: 归真堂) is a company that profits from extracting bile out of bile bears to make traditional Chinese medicine. The company is based in Fujian province of the People's Republic of China.

== Company ==
=== Background ===
Guizhentang was established on December 18, 2000. In July 2004 it was approved by the State Food and Drug Administration. The company have been a success since. By 2010 it was paying some 10 million yuan in taxes. National People's Congress member Qiu Shuhua is the creator of Guizhentang.

The company is a family-run business. It handles an extraction process which involves inserting a catheter into the bear's fistulas abdomen wounded gall bladder. Two of the products made with the extractions are bile bear powder and bile bear gelcaps medicine. The previous bile bear tea is no longer available for sale. According to company investor Zhang Zhiyun, Guizhentang is in the business of selling one of the "Four great Chinese medicine" which consist of bear bile, tiger bones, musk and rhinoceros horns. (This statement varies region by region, and may not be true)

=== Extraction ===
The company said the bile extraction process has gone through three generations. In the first generation, a bear is killed and the bile is taken. In the second generation, techniques came from North Korea in 1984 where "live bears" are used. Tubes are stabbed into the bear for extractions. The third generation is the present techniques where the tubes are smaller, and there are other refinements.

== 2011 stock list controversy ==
In 2011 Guizhentang attempted to list on Hong Kong's alternative stock market, the Growth Enterprise Market. The bid failed. An attempt was made by Jia Baolan, a member of the Communist party CPPCC, to ban extracting biles from living bears under a proposal. The proposal failed. A Shandong University professor even published a paper on the cruelty of the bear bile practice and how it destroys the reputation of Traditional Chinese medicine.

== 2012 stock list controversy ==
=== Early challenges ===
On February 1, 2012, the company appeared on a list of 220 companies waiting for approval to go public at the Shenzhen stock exchange. After the IPO the company can increase the farms to 1,200 bears. The company was met with protest and a great deal of challenge from China SOS, a non-government animal rights organizations. China SOS collected 120 million Chinese yuan (US$19.06 million) to buy shares of the company and stop it from going public.

A public invitation was announced to let the public see the extraction process in February. Hours after the invitation was posted, the company's website was hacked. The company then hired China's top crisis management public relations firm to show off happy bears instead of depressed and disabled bears.

Guizhentang made a public list of journalists allowed into the invitation without prior consultations. According to members of the Nature Conservancy's North Asia, they said the company could be putting on a show. The company did not allow AFP and foreign journalists to enter. Later the company also contradicted this by saying anyone is allowed on invitation day. Some of the people invited to the opening felt the event was a trick.

=== Animal rights group claims ===
According to Animals Asia Foundation the process involves inserting a catheter into the bear and cause serious suffering. The group have also pointed out that 100% of the bears rescued from the process would develop liver cancer.

=== Company claims ===
In 2012 the company is known for claiming the bile extract process cause the bear no pain. They have said "the experience is quite relaxing and the bears are not hurt". Zhang Zhiyun is known for responding to journalists: "You are not a bear. You don't know if it is painful." This has caused heated debates online.

The company argued that their method of extracting bile was legal in the PRC and replaced older methods where the bear had to be killed first. Qiu Shuhua said that "extracting bile is legal and approved by the government since 1995. To be against Guizhentang is equivalent to being against Chinese state."

=== Traditional Chinese Medicine claims ===
Head of the China Association of Traditional Chinese medicine (TCM), Fang Shuting said China has 68 licensed bear farms and more than 10,000 bears farming for bile, that can sell for 4,000 yuan a kilogram. Fang have insisted "that the bears are quite comfortable during the extraction process. The tube is injected into the bear and the bile is pumped out like a faucet. The bear can keep playing while being extracted." Internet users have threatened that if the tubes are so comfortable, the president should have the tubes injected into him. There have been ties shown between TCM association members who make profit off this company.

Xin Yan, a doctor affiliated with Guang'anmen hospital, China's leading institution in the practice of TCM, said that heparin is also extracted from intestines of pigs and ox's lungs, and the manufacturers are listed on the stock exchange.

=== Other analysis ===
Phoenix Television have pointed out a quote from Karl Marx where he said for a profit margin of 300% in a capitalist system, one will commit any crime. Guizhentang has achieved this maximized margin per bear for years. The company also openly calls their bile juice a "name brand" in the market.

Guizhentang do not breed the most bears, as there are 10 other companies in the country that breed more in Heilongjiang and Yanbian. In South China, Guizhentang is the largest.

=== Weibo controversy ===
On February 23, 2012, a Sina Weibo entry appeared with Guizhentang with Google China founder Kai-fu Lee, SOHO China chairman Pan Shiyi and real estate tycoon Ren Zhiqiang asking the animal rights group Asia Animals Foundation to disclose their finances.

The message has since been proven to be fake. Lee made it clear he did not ask the animal rights group to disclose their finances, while Pan Shiyi has said it was a made-up rumor.

=== 2012 Shenzhen store protest ===
On 26 February 2012, a small protest was held at a Guizhentang store in Shenzhen. The protesters were interested in saving the bears and were against the company going public. There have also been many doctors making their case against the practice claiming there are legitimate substitutes, that actual bile from bears are not needed. To counter the protests, some have said this is a "capitalist game" of blocking companies from going public. Additional comments are made that this is no different than being cruel to chicken and ducks.

=== CCTV interview ===
On 26 February 2012, China Central Television journalist Chai Jing interviewed Qiu Shuhua in the investigation programme The Insight. Regarding the statement about being against the state, she said what she is doing is completely within the policy of the government. The entire process fits the requirement of the state down to the manufacturing. She does not understand why there are oppositions to the statement. The journalist points out the far tighter animal rights laws today compared to 30 years ago, Qiu said there is not much to be said about that. Qiu have pointed out the environment is like a kindergarten, where the bears can play when they want. The journalist said that bears are continuously wounded from the tube. Many of them die of infection and liver cancer. Qiu responded that just like a family, people get sick, even doctors get sick. Qiu insisted the bears are raised to be healthy, so that they can produce the best bile juice in the country. The method to test whether the bears are healthy is to see whether they eat. There are no exams.

Qiu believes that since 1993 she has taken bears from other regions, such as Burma and Yunnan, and have increased the overall value of bears. She did cry in the show, and regret ever having trying to go public to the stock market as it led to a lot of trouble from activists.

There were also questions regarding photo evidence of tortured bears. But some of them may not have been Guizhentang bears. Animal rights group AAF representative Zhang Xiaohai made it clear it is not Qiu Shuhua that we hate, but the entire bear bile farming industry. A Guizhentang worker then tried to demonstrate the extraction process and compares it to milking a cow. An argument started over whether painkillers are used. The worker kept insisting the process has no pain, and claims the journalist is not a bear.

== See also ==
- Bile bear
- Panda diplomacy
- Shark fin soup
