= Dog meat consumption in Nigeria =

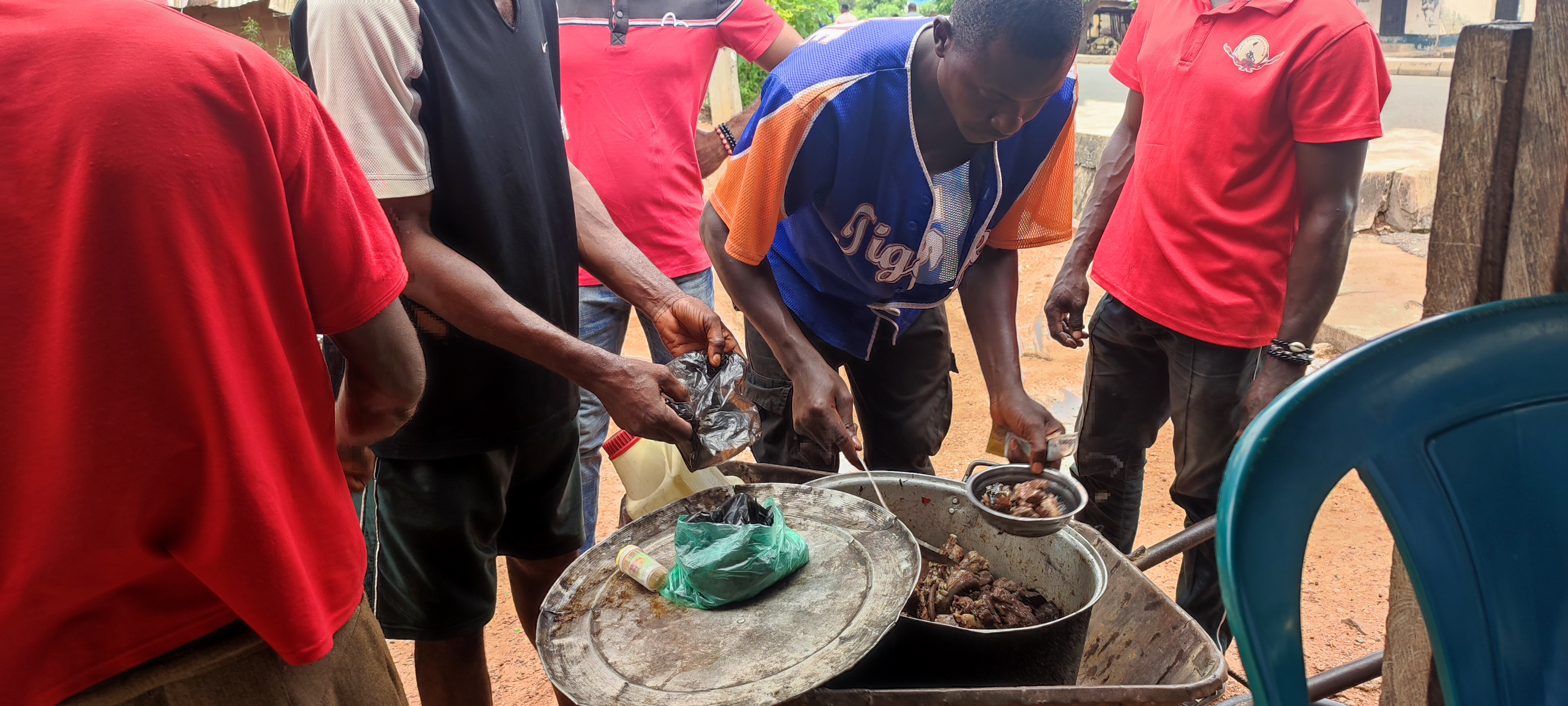
- Roasted dog meat in Ogoja, Nigeria, 2022.
- Alternative names: "404"
- Type: Meat
- Course: Main course
- Place of origin: Nigeria
- Region or state: Southern Nigeria (especially)
- Main ingredients: Dog meat
- Other information: Consumed for taste and tradition; linked with public health concerns such as rabies.

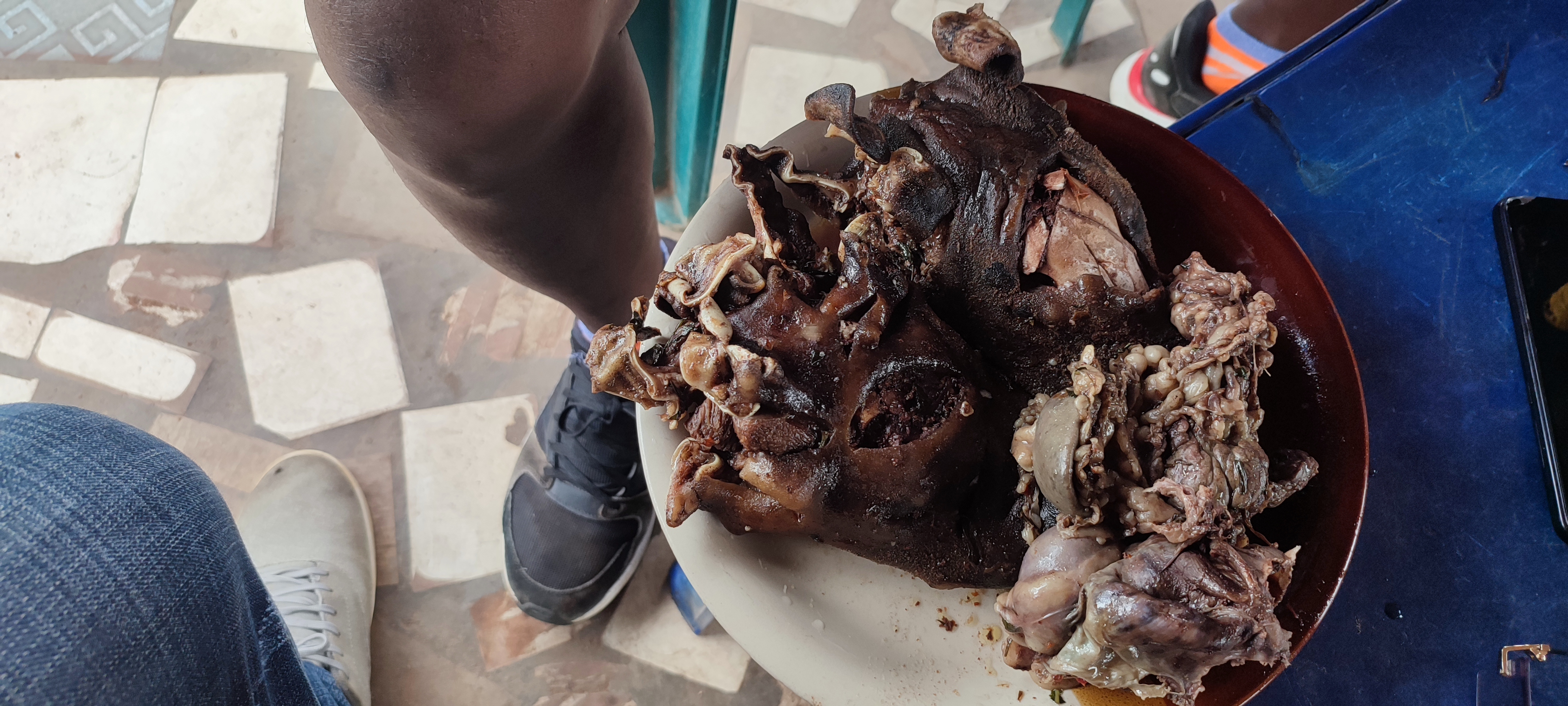
Roasted dog meat in Ogoja, 2022.

Dog meat, locally known as "404", is consumed for various reasons in Nigeria. These include: culinary preference, traditional beliefs, and socio-economic factors.

== Cultural and Economic Aspects ==
In a 2012–2013 survey in Niger State, 80.6% of respondents, predominantly men, acknowledged consuming dog meat. The majority cited its taste (64%) as the primary reason, while others noted medicinal purposes (18.4%) or tradition (8.8%) as motivations.

The trade in dog meat also provides economic support to butchers, traders, and vendors. Most dogs are not bred specifically for meat but are instead purchased from households or sourced as strays, often transported over long distances in crowded cages without food or water. In one study, over 470 dogs were slaughtered during a six-month observation period at five markets in Niger State alone.

In 2016 in Ekiti State, it was reported that dogs were disappearing following a rise in consumption and that the price for an adult dog at market could reach as high as N15,000.

In urban centers such as Lagos, informal dog meat restaurants, referred to as "dog joints", have developed a loyal clientele. Customers cite flavor and purported health benefits such as improved libido and immune strength as key motivations for consumption.

Despite this popularity, the trade remains largely unregulated and operates outside the bounds of formal food safety inspections.

In February 2024, it was reported that dog meat is eaten for lack of other available animal protein as the cost for animal feed for chickens or fish is prohibitively expensive.

Animal rights activists and local NGOs have protested the practice of eating dog meat, citing cruelty and violations of animal protection laws. Their campaigns have met limited success, owing to the cultural and economic aspects of dog meat consumption.

== Health Risks and Rabies Exposure ==
The main public health concern associated with dog meat consumption is rabies, a fatal viral disease primarily transmitted through dog bites or contact with infected neural tissue. Nigeria is among the countries with the highest number of rabies deaths in Africa, estimated at 1,600 per year. The disease is particularly prevalent in regions where stray dogs are used for meat and veterinary oversight is lacking.

In Calabar, a 2013 study documented ten fatal rabies cases over a five-month span, all linked to the trade in stray dogs for meat. None of the patients received post-exposure prophylaxis (PEP), and in most cases, medical treatment was either absent or delayed. The same study found that dogs were often transported from rabies-endemic northern states to the south, increasing the risk of regional transmission.

Multiple investigations have confirmed the presence of rabies virus in dogs destined for human consumption. In one study, 28% of apparently healthy slaughtered dogs in Sokoto and Katsina states tested positive for rabies antigen. A similar study in Borno State found a 31% positivity rate among slaughtered dogs.

Despite awareness of the risks, vaccination coverage among those in the trade is very low. A 2013 survey reported that none of the 12 identified dog butchers in Niger State were vaccinated against rabies, and only two consumers had ever received PEP following suspected exposure.

In 2015, five people died after eating dog meat in Rivers State.

Local veterinarians have expressed concern that many consumers and traders are unaware of the risks associated with exposure to infected animal tissues during slaughter and preparation. Some have called for increased public awareness campaigns, mandatory vaccination of dogs, and regulation of meat inspection practices.

== Diagnostic Challenges and Underreporting ==
Rabies is significantly underreported in Nigeria due to limited diagnostic infrastructure. A 2020 study assessed two World Organisation for Animal Health (OIE)-recommended tests—the direct fluorescent antibody test (DFA) and the direct rapid immunohistochemical test (dRIT)—for use in Nigerian dog meat markets. The study found that dRIT was not only more cost-effective, but also better suited for decentralized, low-resource settings.

Discrepancies were observed between results from Nigerian laboratories and those from a confirmatory lab in South Africa, highlighting quality control issues. In some cases, dogs initially tested negative by DFA in Nigeria were later confirmed positive for rabies using dRIT and PCR testing in South Africa.

== Animal Welfare and Handling Conditions ==
Animal welfare concerns have also been raised regarding the treatment of dogs in the trade. Dogs are often transported in crowded cages, held in poor conditions, and slaughtered using blunt trauma to the head. In some cases, dogs are kept alive for several days without food before being sold or killed. These practices increase the risk of disease transmission through handling and environmental contamination.

Some traders believe in unscientific methods of rabies prevention, such as consuming specific internal organs of the dog thought to offer protection, although there is no scientific basis for such claims.

== Epidemiological Spread Through Trade ==
Further evidence from virological studies revealed that rabies-infected dogs entering the food chain may not always exhibit overt symptoms. This makes visual inspection ineffective for identifying potentially infectious animals.

There are also international case studies showing that rabies transmission may occur in individuals who consume or butcher infected animals, even in the absence of a bite, particularly when there is exposure to neural tissue or blood during slaughter.

== See also ==
- Dog meat consumption in South Korea
- Dog meat consumption in Vietnam
- Dog Meat Festival in China
- Food and drink prohibitions
- Juju
- Nigerian cuisine
- Taboo
