= Lục súc tranh công =

Vietnamese narrative poem

Lục súc tranh công (六畜爭功 "The Quarrel of the Six Beasts") is a classic narrative poem written in late Eighteenth Century Vietnam. Although the title is given in classical chữ Hán the poem itself is written in the vernacular Vietnamese language in Vietnamese chữ Nôm and lục bát verse. The poem is anonymous. It is set in the tuồng form of traditional drama.

First 8 lines of Lục súc tranh công
Vietnamese alphabet (chữ Quốc Ngữ, 𡨸國語)
Trời hoá sanh muôn vật
Đất dong dưỡng mọi loài
Giống nào là giống chẳng có tài?
Người đâu dễ người không nhờ vật?
Long chức quản bổ thiên, dục nhật
Lân quyền tư giúp thánh phò thần
Qui thông hay thành, cát, bại, hung
Phụng lảu biết thạnh, suy, bĩ, thái
