= Animals Asia Foundation =

Hong Kong based animal rights charity

- Formation: 1998
- Headquarters: Hong Kong
- Website: https://www.animalsasia.org/

Animals Asia Foundation (AAF) is a Hong Kong–based charity that seeks to end cruelty to animals in Asia.

== Founding ==
The AAF was founded in 1998 by Jill Robinson, who felt compelled to create the organisation after learning of the plight of the Asiatic black bear known as the "moon bear" because of the yellow crescent on its chest. Moon bears are farmed throughout Asia for their bile, which is used in traditional medicine. The organization raises awareness of the inhumane methods used in bear bile farming, which involve bears living up to 25 years in small cages, with metal catheters inserted into their abdomens for bile extraction, or even open wounds through which the bile drips. The organization also works "to reduce the demand for bile in Asia by promoting affordable, effective and cruelty free alternatives."

== Locations ==
The Foundation's headquarters is in Hong Kong with additional offices in mainland China, Germany, Australia, the United States and the United Kingdom. It also has moon bear sanctuaries in Vietnam and China.

== Selected history ==
In 2012, the organization expressed its concern when Guizhentang Pharmaceutical Company, which keeps 470 bears to extract bile for traditional Chinese medicine, made a bid to go public on the Shenzhen Stock Exchange.

In 2010, the organization released a report complaining about the treatment of wild animals in zoos in China. In response, the Chinese Ministry of Housing and Urban-Rural Development urged zoos and wildlife parks to stop serving wild animal products and holding wildlife performances, and planned to conduct inspections to determine whether the zoos were complying with animal welfare standards.

In February 2009, Animals Asia rescued a dozen malnourished, diseased Asiatic black bears from bile-harvesting farms in southwest China. The bears were given to Animals Asia under an agreement made in 2000 with the government to save sick bears from state and illegal farms. The animals went to the foundation's Moon Bear Rescue Center outside Chengdu, which has handled hundreds of bears since the agreement was signed.

In April 2014, Animals Asia announced plans to convert a bear bile farm with over 130 Asiatic black bears in Nanning, China, into an animal sanctuary. The farm was part of Flower World, a state-owned horticulture and landscaping company.

In 2016, Animals Asia shed light on the extremely poor conditions of the Grandview Mall Aquarium in Guangzhou, China.

In 2017, Animals Asia reported it had secured an agreement with the Government of Vietnam to end all bear bile farming in the country by 2020. An MOU outlined the agreement between Animals Asia and the state-run Vietnam Administration of Forestry to work together to rescue bears still caged on farms across Vietnam – believed to be around 1,000.

== See also ==
- Bile bear – Bears kept in captivity to harvest their bile
- Free the Bears Fund – Australian Wildlife Charity
- Animal welfare and rights in China
