= 7alpha-hydroxysteroid dehydrogenase =

Class of enzymes

7-alpha-hydroxysteroid dehydrogenase

Identifiers
- EC no.: 1.1.1.159
- CAS no.: 39361-64-3

Databases
- IntEnz: IntEnz view
- BRENDA: BRENDA entry
- ExPASy: NiceZyme view
- KEGG: KEGG entry
- MetaCyc: metabolic pathway
- PRIAM: profile
- PDB structures: RCSB PDB PDBe PDBsum
- Gene Ontology: AmiGO / QuickGO
Search
- PMC: articles
- PubMed: articles
- NCBI: proteins

In enzymology, 7alpha-hydroxysteroid dehydrogenase (EC 1.1.1.159) is an enzyme that catalyzes the chemical reaction

cholic acid
+ NAD^{+}
H^{+}
H^{+}
7-ketodeoxycholic acid
+ NADH

The two substrates of this enzyme are the bile acid, cholic acid, and oxidised nicotinamide adenine dinucleotide (NAD^{+}). Its products are 7-ketodeoxycholic acid, reduced NADH, and a proton.

This enzyme belongs to the family of oxidoreductases, specifically those acting on the CH-OH group of donor with NAD^{+} or NADP^{+} as acceptor. The systematic name of this enzyme class is 7alpha-hydroxysteroid:NAD^{+} 7-oxidoreductase. Other names in common use include 7alpha-hydroxy steroid dehydrogenase, and 7alpha-HSDH.

== Structural studies ==
As of late 2007, 3 structures have been solved for this class of enzymes, with PDB accession codes 1AHH, 1AHI, and 1FMC.
