= 7beta-hydroxysteroid dehydrogenase (NADP+) =

Class of enzymes

7-beta-hydroxysteroid dehydrogenase (NADP^{+})

Identifiers
- EC no.: 1.1.1.201
- CAS no.: 79393-83-2

Databases
- IntEnz: IntEnz view
- BRENDA: BRENDA entry
- ExPASy: NiceZyme view
- KEGG: KEGG entry
- MetaCyc: metabolic pathway
- PRIAM: profile
- PDB structures: RCSB PDB PDBe PDBsum
- Gene Ontology: AmiGO / QuickGO
Search
- PMC: articles
- PubMed: articles
- NCBI: proteins

In enzymology, a 7beta-hydroxysteroid dehydrogenase (NADP^{+}) (EC 1.1.1.201) is an enzyme that catalyzes the chemical reaction

a 7beta-hydroxysteroid + NADP^{+} $\rightleftharpoons$ a 7-oxosteroid + NADPH + H^{+}

Thus, the two substrates of this enzyme are 7beta-hydroxysteroid and NADP^{+}, whereas its 3 products are 7-oxosteroid, NADPH, and H^{+}.

This enzyme belongs to the family of oxidoreductases, specifically those acting on the CH-OH group of donor with NAD^{+} or NADP^{+} as acceptor. The systematic name of this enzyme class is 7beta-hydroxysteroid:NADP^{+} 7-oxidoreductase. Other names in common use include NADP^{+}-dependent 7beta-hydroxysteroid dehydrogenase, and 7beta-hydroxysteroid dehydrogenase (NADP^{+}).
