= Animal welfare and rights in South Korea =

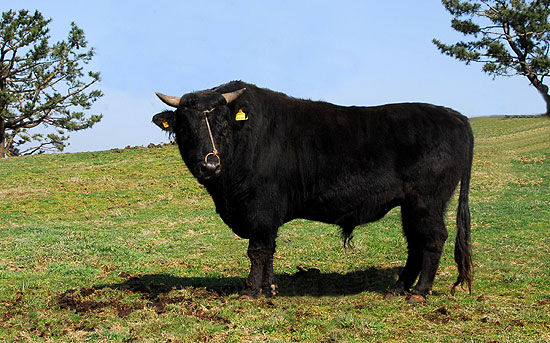
Jeju black cattle are indigenous to Korea.

Animal welfare and rights in South Korea is about the laws concerning and treatment of non-human animals in South Korea. South Korea's animal welfare laws are weak by international standards. There are a handful of animal welfare and rights organizations working in South Korea, which appear to be focused largely on the welfare of companion animals and the dog meat trade.

== Legislation ==
South Korea's major animal welfare legislation is the Animal Protection Act, passed in 1991. The stated aims of the act are to "promote the lives, safety, and welfare of animals and to promote the emotional development of people so as to respect the lives of animals by providing for matters necessary to prevent cruelty to animals and to protect and manage animals appropriately".

The law prohibits cruelty against vertebrates such as cattle, horses, pigs, dogs, cats, rabbits, chickens, ducks, goats, sheep, deer, foxes, and mink, but excluding fish, crustaceans, and other animals commonly used by humans. Cruelty includes killing an animal by a cruel method or in public or in the presence of an animal of the same species; injuring an animal with a "tool or drug"; collecting fluid from the body of a live animal; injuring an animal for entertainment; or otherwise injury without grounds approved by the Ordinance of the Ministry for Food, Agriculture, Forestry, and Fisheries. The law exempts acts done for the prevention or treatment of disease, experimentation or "folk games".

The penalty for cruelty is imprisonment with labor up to 1 year or a ten million won (approximately 8,450 USD) fine. The penalty for abandonment is up to one million won. The law gives the state no powers to ban people from owning animals if they have been convicted of cruelty, nor does it impose higher penalties for repeat animal cruelty offenders.

The law also creates a duty of care. Under the original law, owners and keepers of animals must provide appropriate feed and water and endeavor to ensure that animals in their care exercise and rest adequately. A 2011 amendment changes the "endeavor" wording to a strict liability requirement and creates a penalty of imprisonment for some offences.

Concerning farm animals, in particular, the law requires animals to be registered, stipulates certain protections for animals in transport, and requires that slaughter is done using a method specified by the Ordinance of the Ministry for Food, Agriculture, Forestry, and Fisheries, such as stunning or gas. The government is to formulate and implement a comprehensive animal welfare plan every five years, including matters related to animal farming.

Regarding animal testing, alternatives to animals must be considered, animals less sensitive to pain should be used where possible, anesthetics are required, and lost or abandoned animals which have served humans (e.g. guide dogs) must not be used. The law stipulates that Animal Experimentation Ethics Committees be created in facilities where animals are experimented on.

In addition to the Animal Protection Act, the Wildlife Protection and Management Act prohibits killing wild animals by cruel methods like poisoning; hurting captured animals, and collecting fluid or body parts from a living wild animal.

In 2014 and again in 2020, South Korea received a D out of possible grades A, B, C, D, E, F, G on World Animal Protection's Animal Protection Index.

== Animal issues ==
=== Animal farming and consumption ===
Animal product consumption in South Korea is growing. A report by the Ministry of Agriculture, Food, and Rural Affairs found that per capita meat consumption increased from 11.3 kg in 1980 to 42.7 kg in 2013. Vegetarianism and veganism appear to be rare, though these may be growing.

South Korea's beef cattle originated as draft animals on rice farms. Many are still raised on rice farms as a secondary activity in small operations of 1-4 cattle at a time.

Pigs and chickens are farmed intensively, and their production has grown substantially over the past three decades. Growth in poultry production began to grow significantly in the 1980s and 1990s with the introduction of fast-food fried chicken franchises. Pork production grew by 200% in the 1980s and over 50% in the 1990s. There is a trend towards the concentration of chicken and pig farming in a smaller number of low-cost producers.

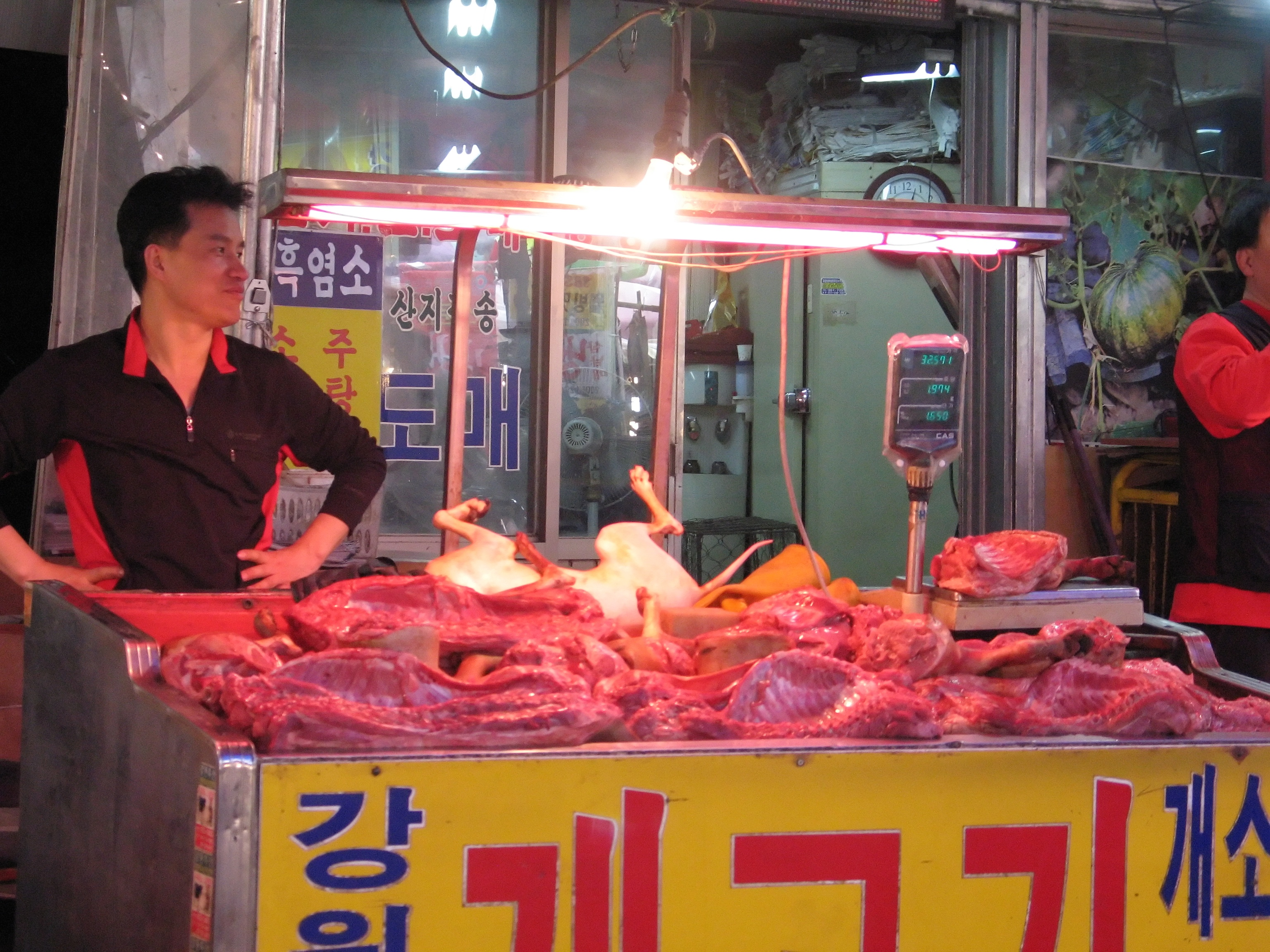
Dog meat sold in Gyeongdong Market, Seoul, South Korea.

The dog meat trade is a major concern for South Korean animal activists. Over 2 million dogs are consumed each year, with pet dogs being stolen and sold into the trade and killed in brutal ways (e.g. beating, electrocution) in violation of the Animal Protection Act. Several thousand cats are also killed for food or medicinal uses each year, sometimes killed in inhumane ways such as boiling alive in pressure cookers.

=== Animal testing ===
In a 2013 poll, 7/10 South Korean respondents supported an end to testing cosmetics on animals. That year, the Ministry of Food and Drug Safety announced a policy proposal to recognize non-animal test results for functional cosmetics like sunscreens and anti-wrinkle creams. In 2015, a law was passed which mandates the use of non-animal alternative tests for certain cosmetics determined by the Ministry of Food and Drug Safety, effective 2018.

The number of animals used in research in 2016, according to the Animal and Plant Quarantine Agency of South Korea, was 2,878,907. By species this was 91.4% rodents (mice, rats etc.), 4.1% fish, 1.9% birds, 1.3% rabbits, and 1.3% other vertebrate species. The number of animals used in research has risen steadily since 2008 when only 760,296 animals were used.

A new opinion poll conducted in July 2020 by independent polling company Realmeter, and commissioned by Humane Society International/Korea, reveals that the majority of the Korean public want to see their tax money spent on supporting these advanced approaches instead of animal testing. Almost 82% of respondents want to see the 21st National Assembly session demonstrate legislative support for alternatives to animal testing, which includes approaches such as human organ-mimics and tests using human-derived cells instead of experiments on mice, monkeys and dogs.

=== Animals used for clothing ===
There are no fur farms in South Korea, but South Korea is one of the five largest fur importers in the world, purchasing ₩247 billion worth of furs in 2012. The popularity of fur has risen in recent years, with total market value rising from ₩789 billion in 2007 to ₩1.1 trillion in 2012.

Demand for leather is also on the rise, with an increase of 48% between 2007 and 2012. The market value of leather reached ₩1.6 trillion in 2012, 66% of which is produced domestically.

== Animal activism ==
There are a growing number of animal rights organizations in South Korea, with interest in animal welfare on the rise. The largest and most respected animal organizations in the country are Korean Animal Welfare Association and Korea Animal Rights Advocates

International Aid for Korean Animals (IAKA) was founded in 1997 to educate the public, especially schoolchildren, about the cruelty of trade in dog meat and animal medicine. Their sister organization the Korea Animal Protection and Education Society (KAPES) educates the public about adoption, spaying, and neutering, and proper pet care.

In 2016 the animal rights group Animal Arirang launched a petition to include clauses on animal rights in the South Korean constitution.

Local groups including LIFE, Busan Korean Alliance for Prevention of Cruelty to Animals, KoreanK9Rescue, Yongin Animal Care Association, Animal Liberation Wave and others have a vocal and visible presence on a number of issues, particularly over the years opposing the dog meat industry. Some of these Korean groups have also formed alliances with like-minded international animal protection groups. The most prominent of these is Humane Society International which also has a local Korean office, HSI/Korea. HSI/Korea is best known for its Models for Change program working with dog meat farmers to close their farms and transition to alternative, humane livelihoods such as mushroom farming. Since 2015 HSI/Korea has rescued more than 2,500 dogs from dog meat farms and has partnered with multiple other Korean groups in petitions, protests, awareness raising campaigns and farm rescues.

The California-based animal rights organization In Defense of Animals partners with South Korean allies to stage animal rights protests, rescue dogs from dog farms, and lobby the government to better enforce existing animal protection laws.

== See also ==
- Dog meat consumption in South Korea
- Timeline of animal welfare and rights
