= List of bear sanctuaries =

This list includes bear conservation centers, bear forests, bear refuges, and bear reserves around the world.

== List ==
Country	Region	Name	Opening date	Organization
=== North America ===
Canada	Sprucedale, McMurrich/Monteith, Parry Sound District	Bear with Us Sanctuary and Rehabilitation Centre for Bears	1992	Bear with Us Inc.
United States	Sitka, Alaska	Fortress of the Bear	2003	Fortress of the Bear
=== Asia ===
Cambodia	Takéo	Phnom Tamao Wildlife Rescue Centre	1997	Free the Bears
Laos	Luang Prabang	Luang Prabang Wildlife Sanctuary	2017	Free the Bears
Laos	Luang Prabang	Tat Kuang Si Bear Rescue Centre	2002	Free the Bears
Vietnam	Ninh Bình province	Bear Sanctuary Ninh Binh	2019	Four Paws
Vietnam	Tam Đảo	Vietnam Bear Rescue Centre	2008	Animals Asia Foundation
Vietnam	Tân Phú	Cat Tien Bear Sanctuary	2017	Free the Bears
China	Chengdu	China Bear Rescue Centre	2000	Animals Asia Foundation
China	Nanning	Nanning Bear Farm	2014	Animals Asia Foundation
=== Europe ===
Bulgaria	Belitsa	Bear Sanctuary Belitsa	2000	Four Paws in cooperation with the Brigitte Bardot Foundation
Germany	Anholt	Anholter Bears Forest	1999	International Bear Federation Germany e.V. Deutscher Tierschutzbund
Germany	Stuer	Bear Sanctuary Müritz	2006	Four Paws
Greece	Nymfaio	Bear Conservation Area	1993	ARCTUROS
Kosovo	Mramor	Bear Sanctuary Prishtina	2013	Four Paws
Austria	Arbesbach	Bear Sanctuary Arbesbach	1998	Four Paws
Romania	Zărnești	Libearty Bear Sanctuary	2005	Millions of Friends Association
Switzerland	Arosa	Arosa Bear Sanctuary	2018	Four Paws and the Arosa region
Ukraine	Lviv	Bear Sanctuary Domazhyr	2017	Four Paws
Ukraine	Zhytomyr	White Rock Bear Shelter	2012	Save Wild
