= Bear Sanctuary Belitsa =

Park in Bulgaria

Bear Sanctuary Belitsa (formerly "Dancing Bears Park Belitsa") is a project run by Four Paws and the Brigitte Bardot Foundation, near the town of Belitsa in southwest Bulgaria, which provides mistreated and neglected brown bears with a home.

== History and objective ==
Established in 2000, the park provides a home for brown bears that were held captive in inadequate conditions, especially those traditionally raised and trained to dance in public. At the outset, the park housed more than twenty bears from Bulgaria and Serbia. The animal welfare organisation Four Paws took measures against the inhumane practice, and in cooperation with the Brigitte Bardot Foundation, established the sanctuary. As there are no more "dancing bears" to rescue, the name was changed to Bear Sanctuary Belitsa in May 2022.

== Location and size ==
The park is located in Rila, about 180 kilometres south of Sofia, 12 kilometres from the town Belitsa, and about 35 kilometres from Bansko. The sanctuary comprises 120,000 square metres, divided into seven open-air enclosures. It offers dense forests and hills for roaming and seclusion, ponds for swimming, and artificial dens.

== Number and origin of bears ==
Since 2000, 31 former dancing bears from Bulgaria, Serbia, and Albania, four from Bulgarian zoos, and two young bears owned privately have been rescued and housed at the park. In January 2019, there were 25 bears living at the sanctuary. The first three rescues, Kalina, Mariana, and Stefan, were transferred to the park in 2000. In 2007, the last three dancing bears of Bulgaria were transferred, and in 2009, the final three from Serbia were also accommodated at the sanctuary.

== Education and visitor service ==
Bear Sanctuary Belitsa is open to visitors from April until November every year. Guided tours provide information about the condition suffered by the formerly captive animals and raise awareness about their natural needs as well as their conservation.

== See also ==
- Bear Sanctuary Prishtina
- Bear Sanctuary Domazhyr
- Bear Sanctuary Ninh Binh
- Bear Sanctuary Müritz
