= Amir Khalil =

Egyptian veterinarian

Amir Khalil (born 21 November 1964 in El Fayoum) is an Egyptian veterinarian and Director of Project Development at the animal welfare organisation Four Paws International. He is most known as the war vet, saving animals from disaster areas and war zones.

== Life ==
Khalil was born on 21 November 1964 in El Fayoum, Egypt, where his father worked for the Ministry of Interior as a pharmacist and his mother was a housewife. In 1989, Khalil moved to Vienna, Austria where he resides with his three daughters Nadja Khalil, Sarah Khalil and Julia Khalil. He speaks six languages, including Coptic Egyptian.

After studying veterinary medicine at Cairo University, Amir Khalil received a scholarship to study wild animals in Pretoria, South Africa. When he was 25, he won a scholarship to Edinburgh University but chose to move to Vienna to start working for the international animal welfare organisation Four Paws.

== Work ==
In 1994, Amir Khalil began volunteering with Four Paws International’s dog castration projects in Romania. He was appointed Four Paws’ Director of Project Development and Director of the Disaster Relief Unit in 1997.

Khalil conducts aid missions for animals in conflict zones. He provided aid for animals in Iraq’s Baghdad Zoo in 2003, in Libya’s Tripoli Zoo and in Cairo during the Arab Spring of 2011. In 2014, he ran four rescue missions in the Gaza Strip, and removed two lion cubs from the Rafah Camp in 2015. The following year in the Gaza Strip he closed down the Al-Bisan Zoo and the Khan Younis Zoo. In April 2017, he evacuated a bear and a lion, the two last survivors of the Montazah Al-Morour Zoo in Mosul, Iraq. In July 2017, he rescued 13 animals from the abandoned Magic World Recreational Park near Aleppo, Syria.

Amir Khalil has established animal sanctuaries in Bulgaria, Jordan, Myanmar, South Africa and Ukraine. He spearheaded the movement to rescue performing bears in the Balkans, where he saved 27 bears. In 2001, he founded the Dancing Bears Park Belitsa, with the support of the Brigitte Bardot Foundation.

In 2006, he established the Lionsrock Big Cat Sanctuary in Bethlehem, South Africa. Together with the Princess Alia Foundation, he founded the Al Ma’wa Sanctuary for Nature and Wildlife. In 2018, he founded Elephants Lake, a 17,000-hectare reserve and rehabilitation centre for former logging elephants in Myanmar’s Bago region.

In January 2020, Amir Khalil rescued sick lions at a zoo in Khartoum together with Four Paws, after worldwide outrage following concerning reports of the animals’ condition. From September to November 2020, Amir Khalil from the animal welfare organisation Four Paws International with the support of journalist and businessman Eric Margolis, singer Cher and Frank Goeritz from the Leibniz Institute for Zoo and Wildlife Research (IZW) examined and approved "the world’s loneliest elephant" Kaavan for travel to an elephant sanctuary.

== Trivia ==
Amir Khalil is featured in Ai Weiwei’s documentary film Human Flow (2017) and the non-fiction books Father of Lions: One Man’s Remarkable Quest to Save the Mosul Zoo (2019) by Louise Callaghan, Paarden Vliegen Businessclass (2019) by Olaf Koens, Magic World: Rescuing the Last Animals from the Aleppo Zoo (forthcoming 2021) by Sharon Guynup, and Dancing Bears: True Stories of People Nostalgic for Life Under Tyranny (2014) by Witold Szablowski. Amir Khalil’s missions have been featured on TV programmes including CNN’s Great Big Story, Animal Planet and National Geographic.

Amir Khalil has been a Member of the Society of Tropical Medicine and Parasitology in Austria since 1999.

Since 2001, he has been Honorary Doctor at the University of Sofia, Bulgaria.
