= Four Paws =

Austria-based global animal welfare organisation

FOUR PAWS
- Four Paws International
- Founded: 4 March 1988; 38 years ago
- Founder: Helmut Dungler (1963–2020)
- Type: 501(c)(3)
- Headquarters: Vienna, Austria
- Region served: Worldwide
- Fields: Animal welfare; direct-appeal campaigns; crisis intervention; lobbying; public relations; development of standards
- Board of directors: Josef Pfabigan; Luciana D'Abramo; Alexandra Mandoki
- Subsidiaries: Australia, Austria, Belgium (EU office), Bulgaria, Cambodia, France, Germany, Kosovo, Netherlands, South Africa, Switzerland, Thailand, Ukraine, United Kingdom, United States, Vietnam
- Website: four-paws.org

Four Paws (stylized FOUR PAWS) is a global animal welfare organisation headquartered in Vienna, Austria. It focuses on improving the living conditions of animals under direct human influence, by revealing suffering, rescuing animals in need, and protecting them.

== History ==
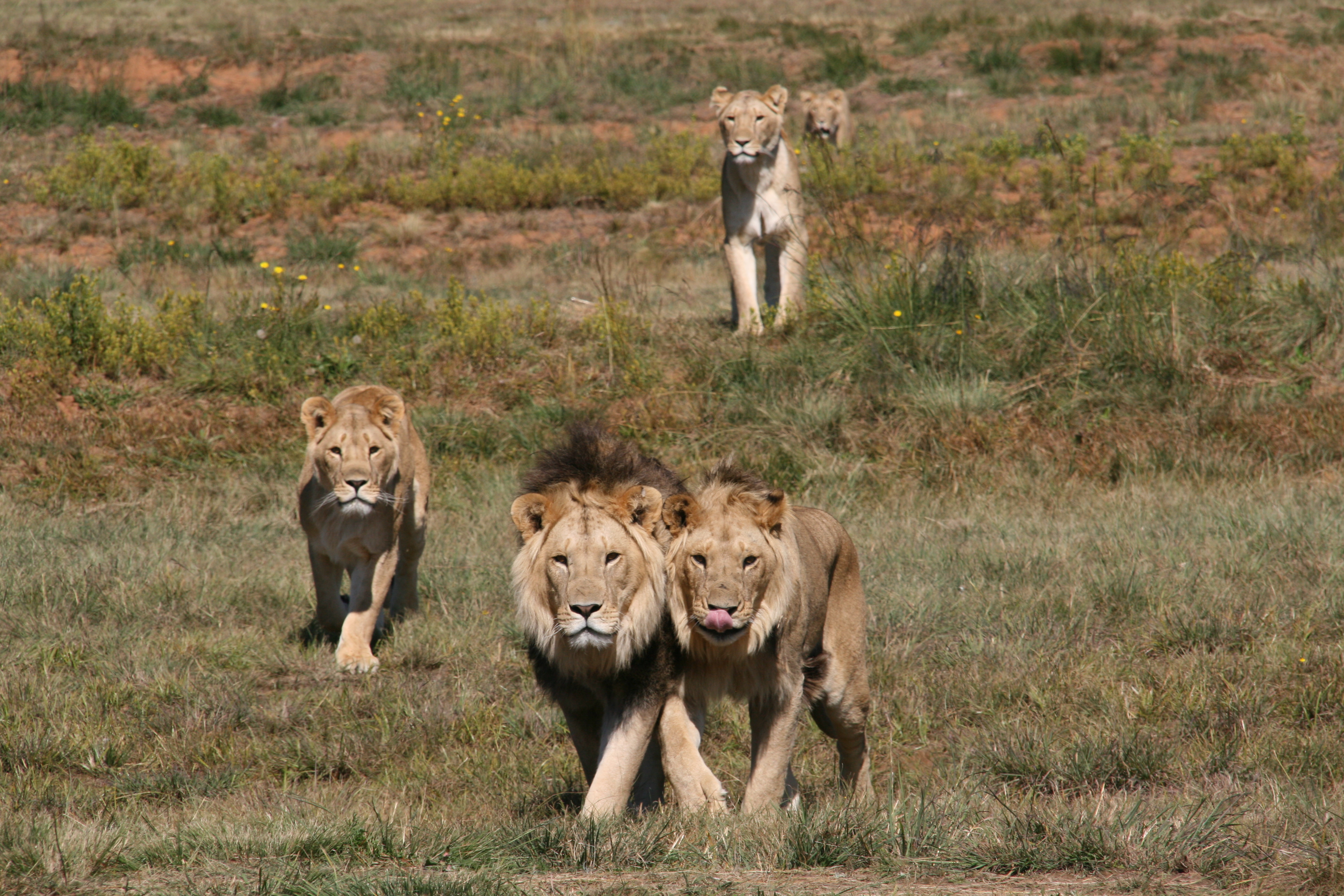
Lionsrock big cat sanctuary, Bethlehem, South Africa (2011)

Four Paws was founded on 4 March 1988 by Helmut Dungler and friends to protect animals from being farmed for their fur.

In 1991, Four Paws demanded the mandatory labelling of eggs and a total ban on battery cages for egg-laying hens. In 1998, the organisation opened the first sanctuary for bears in Arbesbach, Austria. In 1999, the foundation brought about the closure of Austria's largest battery cage egg producer.

In 2000, Bear Sanctuary Belitsa opened in Bulgaria, and the first three former dancing bears moved in. In 2002, animal welfare entered Germany's basic law, and Federal Minister Renate Künast thanked Four Paws by name. In 2005, the Federal Animal Welfare Act came into force in Austria and banned both fur farming and the use of wild animals in circuses. In 2008, the Lionsrock Big Cat Sanctuary opened in Bethlehem, South Africa. Helmut Dungler was awarded the Silver Order of Merit for Services Rendered to the Republic of Austria.

In 2010, Four Paws started a collaboration with the Princess Alia Foundation of Jordan, with the Al Ma'wa for Nature and Wildlife project. In 2012, an EU-wide ban on conventional battery cages for hens came into force.

In 2014, the Bear Sanctuary Prishtina in Kosovo was opened. In 2015, Four Paws initiated a campaign against canned lion hunting, which attracted 281,000 supporters. In 2018, the organisation rescued lions and bears from "Europe's worst zoo", in Tirana, Albania. The same year, the first International Animal Welfare Summit was organised by Four Paws in Vienna, with famous guests that included Chinese artist Ai Weiwei.

On 17 January 2018, Switzerland took a step against anonymous pet trafficking on the internet. From 1 March 2018, online traders have had to provide their full name and address as well as the country of origin and breeding of the dogs offered for sale.

On 5 January 2020, Four Paws founder and president, Helmut Dungler, died unexpectedly. That month, Four Paws rescued sick lions from a zoo in Khartoum, Sudan, after worldwide outrage following concerning reports of the animals' condition. On 16 April, claims by Four Paws in The Independent stated that there had been a surge in consumption of dog and cat meat in Vietnam as a result of fake news suggesting it would cure COVID-19. Four Paws' former head of stray animal care in Asia Katherine Polak was quoted as saying she strongly suspected doctors were now recommending cat and dog meat to treat the condition. However, on 24 April, the fact-checking nonprofit PolitiFact rated the claim as false. Reporter Tina Nguyen called it mind-boggling and a nasty racist attack. Four Paws responded with an official statement defending their claims and referring to market research studies conducted between January and March 2019 in Cambodia and May–August 2019 in Vietnam. On 4 September, the organisation, together with veterinarians Amir Khalil and Frank Goeritz from the Leibniz Institute for Zoo and Wildlife Research, examined and approved "the world's loneliest elephant", Kaavan, for travel from the Islamabad Zoo in Pakistan to an elephant sanctuary in Cambodia. The rescue mission to the Cambodia Wildlife Sanctuary, at the end of November 2020, was supported by singer Cher's NGO Free the Wild and by businessman Eric Margolis.

In January 2021, Four Paws published the Austrian edition of the Meat Atlas, in cooperation with the Heinrich Böll Foundation and the environmental protection organization Global 2000.

In 2022, Four Paws provided emergency veterinary care during the war in Ukraine. In March, four tigers were rescued from Argentina to find a new home in South Africa. It was the organization's first rescue in South America. Further rescue operations were carried out in Albania, Pakistan, Romania, Sudan, and Vietnam. Politically, the organisation stepped up its campaign against European fur farming and in favour of climate protection.

In 2023, the organisation provided emergency aid following the earthquakes in Turkey and Syria. Other measures included supporting the European Citizens' Initiative "Fur Free Europe", which collected over 1.5 million signatures for an EU-wide ban on fur farming and ending the use of mulesed wool at Nike.

In 2024, Four Paws participated in negotiations on the UN pandemic agreement at the World Health Organization to establish prevention through improved animal welfare. In addition to rescue missions in Bulgaria and Slovakia, a new organisational strategy was implemented, which led, among other things, to the expansion of infrastructure in rescue centres such as Felida Big Cat Sanctuary in the Netherlands. In June, the Four Paws documentary Dethroned premiered in Vienna. In November, the documentary Eating the Future had its world premiere at the Films for Future Festival at the Rote Fabrik in Zurich, Switzerland.

In 2025, Four Paws chaired the first animal welfare session at the World Health Summit and anchored the "One Health" approach in the global pandemic agreement. The organisation also participated in the drafting of a new EU law to combat the illegal trade in dogs and cats. In October, Four Paws led one of its largest missions to date to rescue over 60 big cats and two bears from a former zoo in Argentina. Other campaigns targeted mulesing at Michael Kors.

In August 2026, Four Paws launched "one of the largest relocations of captive big cats in the world", with the rescue of 30 lions and tigers from the Luján Zoo in Argentina, which had closed in 2020.

== Objectives ==
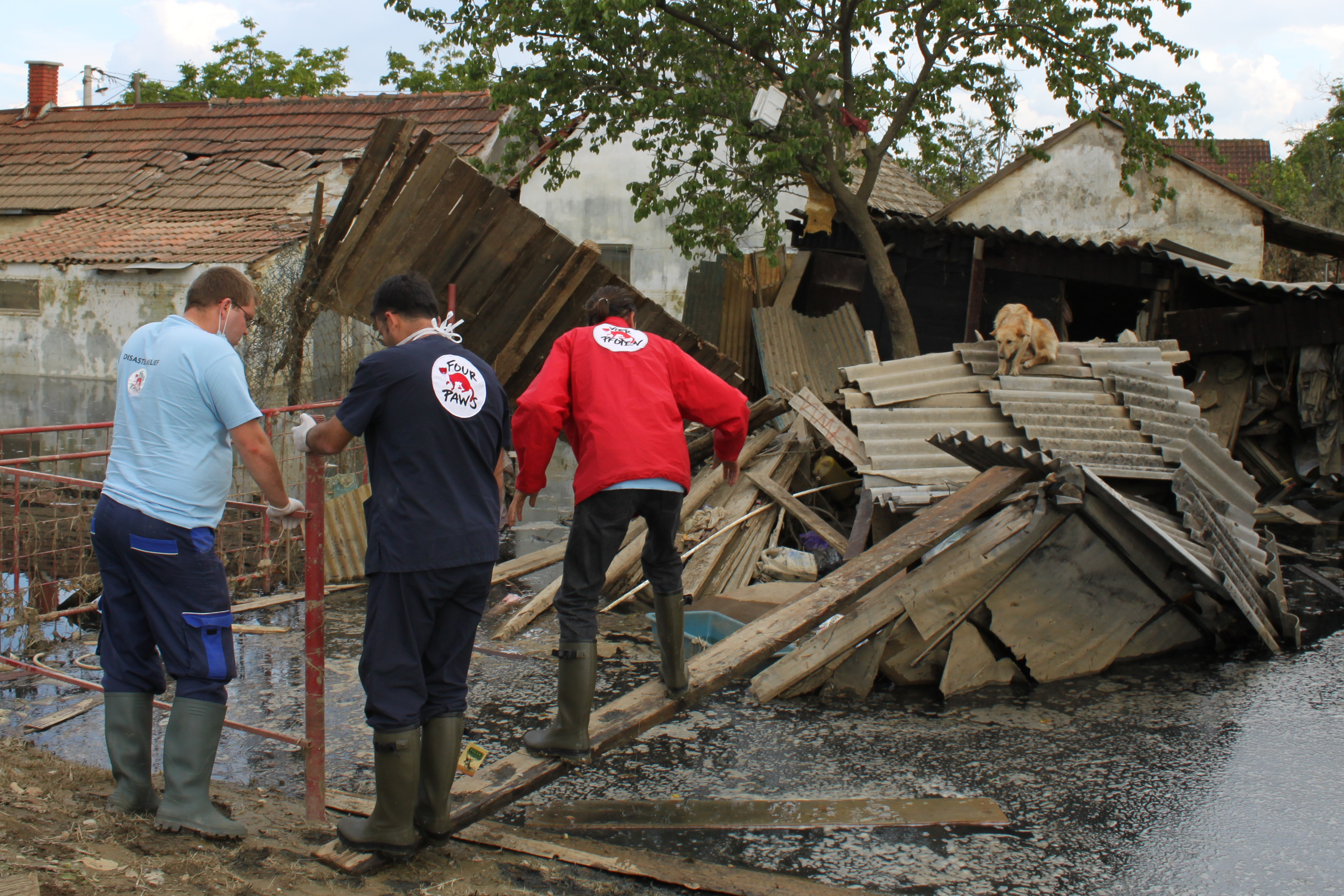
Disaster Relief Unit (2014)

The organization sees itself as a "strong, global, and independent voice for animals under direct human control". Four Paws' goals include:

- Public awareness campaigns
- A ban on fur farming
- Strict restrictions on keeping wild animals in private captivity
- A ban on wild animals in circuses

== Organisation ==
Four Paws, which finances its work through donations, positions itself as "a strong, global, and independent voice for animals under direct human control" by offering sustainable solutions for animals in need, changing consumer behaviour, driving legal change, and building partnerships. Its purpose is to inform the general public about animal welfare. The organisation also supports a ban on farming animals for fur, strict limitations on keeping wild animals in private captivity, and a ban on wild animals in circuses.

The work of Four Paws is divided into different areas of expertise, which operate across various countries and ensure that animal welfare activities are implemented into both national and global agendas. Four Paws is represented in 16 national offices worldwide and operates 13 wild animal sanctuaries and cooperation projects such as Bear Sanctuary Belitsa (with the Brigitte Bardot Foundation), Bear Sanctuary Domazhyr, Bear Sanctuary Müritz, Bear Sanctuary Ninh Binh, and Bear Sanctuary Prishtina. The organisation is a partner of organisations like the European Citizens' Initiative and Eurogroup for Animals.

== Projects ==
Four Paws projects include the following:

- Bears: Four Paws rescues bears forced to live in poor conditions in circuses, zoos, or in private hands. The organisation has projects in Albania, Slovenia, Vietnam, Austria, Bulgaria, Poland, Ukraine, and Kosovo.

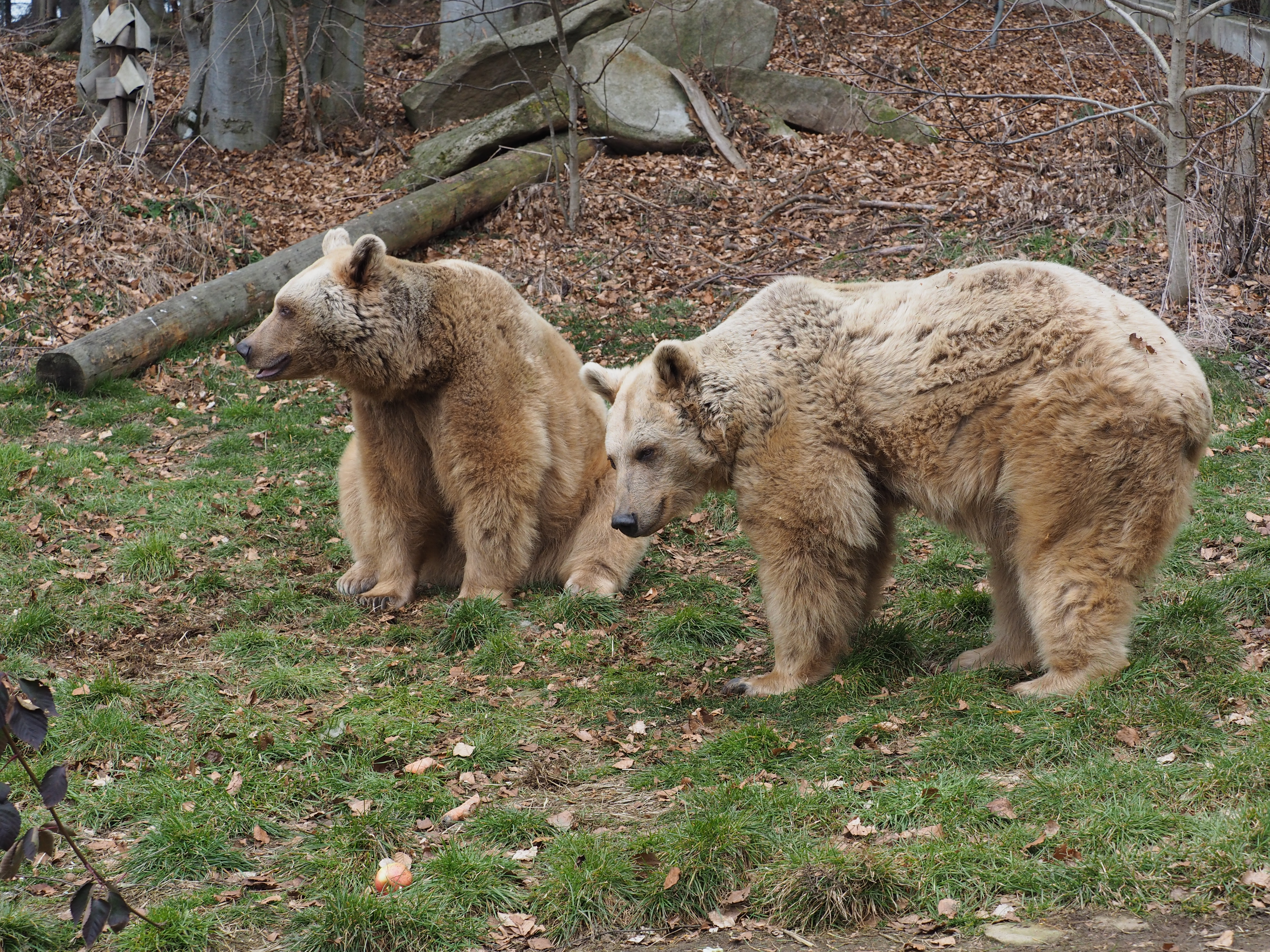
The Arbesbach sanctuary in Austria was built to provide a new home for brown bears formerly held in captivity.

- Big cats: Four Paws has established sanctuaries and projects for big cats in South Africa, Jordan, and the Netherlands, The organisation also cooperates and works with several partner organisations within the welfare sector.
- Stray animals: Four Paws creates solutions to prevent outbreaks of disease and uncontrolled levels of reproduction among strays in places such as Thailand, Moldova, Myanmar, Romania, Ukraine, and Cambodia In addition, the organization is working to sustainably end the dog and cat meat trade.
- Orangutans: Four Paws looks after orphaned orangutans and prepares them to live independently in the wild. Furthermore, the organisation funds a forest school in Indonesia's East Kalimantan.
- Fur farming: Four Paws supports a ban on farming animals for fur, a legal obligation to label all fur products and, in the long term, a Europe-wide ban on importing and selling all fur products. In August 2018, Four Paws joined the Fur Free Alliance to launch a new campaign urging fashion brand Prada to adopt a fur-free policy like Gucci, Versace, Armani, Donna Karan, and Hugo Boss. In February 2021, the organisation published a statement on the assessment conducted by the Food and Agriculture Organization of the United Nations, the World Organisation for Animal Health, and the World Health Organization on SARS-CoV-2 in animals used for fur farming, demonstrating high risks for public health.
- Farm animals: Four Paws advocates for the welfare of farm animals through projects that address issues with procedures like mulesing, promote reduced meat consumption, support higher animal welfare standards, and push for improved farming practices. The organization also works to reduce animal transport times and lobbies for legislative change.
- Assistance for animals in distress: Four Paws rescues animals after natural disasters and helps local people whose livelihood depends upon the animals.
- European Union: The organisation has urged the European Parliament to call for stricter regulation on the trade in live wild animals, a clear commitment to step up efforts to combat the illegal wildlife trade, as well as EU and member states' financial support to wildlife rescue centres and sanctuaries.

== Awards ==
- 2025: People's Choice Awards (Smiley Charity Film Awards) for the Four Paws animated film Be Their Voice.
- 2025: Gold Award for the Four Paws documentary Dethroned in the Wildlife and Conservation category of the International Tourism Film Festival Africa.
- 2024: UK Film Festival Award for the Four Paws documentary Eating the Future in the Best Feature Documentary category.

== Publications ==
- Meat Exhaustion Day: When Meat Is Eating Up the Planet.

== See also ==
- List of bear sanctuaries
- List of animal sanctuaries
