= Env (disambiguation) =

Env or ENV may refer to:

== Biology ==
- Env (gene), a viral envelope

== Devices ==
- ENV, a hydrogen motorcycle
- LG enV (VX9900), a Verizon cellular phone
- General Motors EN-V, an electric autonomous vehicle with cabin on two wheels

== Entities ==
- IATA code for Wendover Airport
- E.N.V. Motor Syndicate, an early Anglo-French aircraft engine company
- Education for Nature - Vietnam, a Vietnamese wildlife protection NGO

== Software ==
- env, a Unix shell utility
