= Nexhmije =

Nexhmije or Nexhmie is a given name. People with the name include:

- Nexhmije Pagarusha (1933–2020), Kosovo-Albanian singer and actress
- Nexhmije Hoxha (1921–2020), Albanian communist politician
- Nexhmie Zaimi (1917–2003), Albanian American author and journalist
