= Education for Nature Vietnam =

Education for Nature Vietnam (ENV) was set up in 2000 and according to their website is Vietnam's "first local non-governmental organization to focus on wildlife protection."

They have offices in Hanoi.

There are three main planks to the work of ENV:

- Persuading the Vietnamese public of the need to protect nature and wildlife
- Convincing Vietnamese society that using animal products is hastening the extinction of endangered species
- Working with the Vietnamese authorities to strengthen wildlife protection laws and enforce the current legislation to its full extent to stop illegal wildlife trade

== Wildlife trade in Vietnam ==
As well as being a source of endangered wildlife and a consumer of protected animal products, Vietnam is also a major international transit hub for illegal wildlife goods from other countries in South East Asia and as far afield as South Africa. The main destination for much of the illegal wildlife trade is China.

Due to the burgeoning economies of both China and Vietnam in recent years, the expanding middle class, with larger disposable incomes, created a surge in demand for wildlife trade products such as rhino horn and tiger bone paste.

Two species of pangolin, believed to be the most trafficked mammal in the world and native to Vietnamese forests, are particularly under threat. Many thousands are caught and traded between China and Vietnam every year.

Pangolin scales are in demand for use in traditional medicine, and the meat is served in restaurants as a high-end delicacy.

Rhinos, annihilated in Vietnam in 2010, are also threatened with extinction as a result of wildlife trade: in 2007, 13 were killed for their horns. By 2014, 1215 rhinos were poached and killed in South Africa.

== Approach ==
ENV aims to reduce illegal wildlife trade in three ways by:

- Mobilizing the public to support wildlife protection
- Strengthening wildlife crime law enforcement by direct support and assistance, and mobilizing public opinion and participation
- Working with high-level decision-makers and government agencies to formulate and improve wildlife-related policy and legislation.

=== Reducing demand ===
ENV strives to curb demand for wildlife products in Vietnam via Public Service Announcements (PSAs) on TV and radio. They concentrate their efforts on tigers, rhinos, bears and pangolins. The emphasis of these short infomercials is that wildlife trade products, such as pangolin scales, rhino horn and tiger bones, lack medicinal value. A recent 2016 campaign, for instance, pointed out that rhino horn is made of keratin, the same substance as human hair and nails. One would, therefore, be as well eating one's own finger nails and hair.

It is well documented that there is now a growing social stigma attached to the use of wildlife products as vulgar status symbols. Money does not buy taste or a social conscience it would appear. But just as important is the fact that being a consumer of illegal wildlife products helps to line the pockets of organized crime and encourages cruelty to animals.

The PSAs are aired across Vietnam on up to 80 TV channels, reaching millions of viewers. ENV also produce radio adverts that are regularly broadcast on Voice of Vietnam radio. Since 2008, ENV has partnered with Voice of Vietnam to produce a radio show about wildlife protection topics every month. ENV also works with well-known Vietnamese celebrities to spread the wildlife protection message to their fans and the general public.

Further efforts to cut consumer demand have included the establishment of Wildlife Safety Zones in conjunction with ministries, government offices, corporate partners and markets across Vietnam. Among the partners signed up are the US Embassy, Mercedes-Benz, BMW, and the Daewoo Hotel.

Outreach events are also run at universities, parks and shopping malls to promote public awareness and involvement in their campaigns.

For example, ENV, in partnership with the South African organization Endangered Wildlife Trust, launched a targeted campaign to convince shoppers to ‘Say no to rhino horn’ through awareness events and viral media activities.

=== Strengthening enforcement ===
In addition to reducing demand, ENV are heavily involved in ensuring law enforcement agencies prosecute wildlife crime offenders to the full extent of the law. In recent years there has been a perception that the authorities are not taking wildlife crime as seriously as they should and are reluctant to prosecute anyone other than low level players involved in wildlife trafficking.

In 2005 ENV established a Wildlife Crime Unit (WCU) to encourage the Vietnamese public to report wildlife offences. The WCU operates the Wildlife Crime Hotline 1-800-1522, a national toll-free hotline that the public can use to report wildlife crimes throughout the country. Crimes can also be reported via an email hotline and a smart phone application.

Since its establishment, ENV's national crime database has recorded over 10,000 reports of wildlife crimes.

Getting the public involved is a major concern for ENV. It has established wildlife protection volunteer clubs in over 15 major cities across Vietnam. These clubs carry out awareness events, monitor businesses and report wildlife crimes. They also have promoted greater public involvement in wildlife protection.

Since 2013 ENV has cracked down on consumer demand by targeting major cities including Hanoi, Huế, Dong Ha, Ho Chi Mi, Vinh and Da Nang. Their campaign involves surveying restaurants, hotels, bars, traditional medicine shops, pet shops and markets across selected districts. Any violations discovered are reported to the district People's Committee, along with a request that they work with local authorities to tackle each violation.

Two months later, a follow-up team from ENV inspects the establishments that had previously been reported and tracks any changes. Report cards are then sent to the People's Committees, summarizing their effectiveness compared to colleagues in different districts. In areas where the process has been completed, wildlife crime has fallen by between 39% and 77%.

ENV also tackles illegal online wildlife trade through its internet crime campaign. Thousands of links reported as selling wildlife have been removed, and numerous websites and forums have joined ENV's wildlife safety zone by banning all wildlife advertising.

Accompanying this outreach, the wildlife protection organization undertakes wildlife crime investigations. Current investigations focus on crime syndicates that support the illegal transnational trade of endangered species, such as a major criminal network that smuggled frozen tigers from Laos into Vietnam. An investigation into the marine turtle trade in Vietnam resulted in a seizure of 10 tons of marine turtles, and an ongoing criminal investigation by the police. ENV produced a film about the case, and sent it to hundreds of legislators to encourage them to prosecute the kingpin of the marine turtle trade.

In May 2020, ENV and Four Paws rescued a bear cub from illegal wildlife trade and brought to Bear Sanctuary Ninh Binh.

=== Improving policy and legislation ===
The third leg of the ENV strategy stool is to work with the highest levels of government to bring about change on a national level by improving legislation and ensuring sound policy in support of wildlife protection. Ultimately their goal is a legal framework in Vietnam that effectively protects endangered species. But much of their day-to-day work revolves around helping to address conflicts and loopholes in existing legislation. .

Among ENV's most notable cases recently include:

- Successfully campaigning to prevent authorities from auctioning off tiger products seized from poachers, arguing that it would increase demand and undermine wildlife protection efforts. ENV's intervention helped to stop this practice.
- Working with authorities to close down bear bile tourism in Halong Bay. From 2007, hundreds of Korean tourists arrived each day to watch a live bear bile extraction and to buy the bile to take back to their country. After an intensive joint enforcement campaign by Quang Ninh People's Committee, relevant government agencies, and ENV, bear bile tourism in Ha Long was shut down in May 2014, putting the bear farms out of business. Since 2005, there has been a 72% decline in the number of bears caged on farms and exploited for their bile in Vietnam. ENV also fought for any new bears being kept illegally to be confiscated by the government, not left in their owner's hands. Since September 2011, there hasn't been a single case where an illegal bear was discovered and not confiscated.
- ENV is currently opposing proposals to legalize the farming of endangered species in Vietnam, as they risk increasing demand for wildlife trade products, as well as complicating enforcement efforts.
- ENV also focuses on investigating, prosecuting and punishing major wildlife crime figures. By working to improve the penal code and fighting for the implementation of Decree 160 at provincial level, ENV aims to make it easier to tackle the kingpins of the illegal wildlife trade. ENV also works to improve awareness of current wildlife protection law in all provinces of Vietnam, enabling more effective law enforcement throughout the country. ENV encourages local authorities to comply with Decree 160 by not auctioning off endangered wildlife such as pangolins after confiscation.
