= Bear Sanctuary Müritz =

Bear sanctuary in Germany

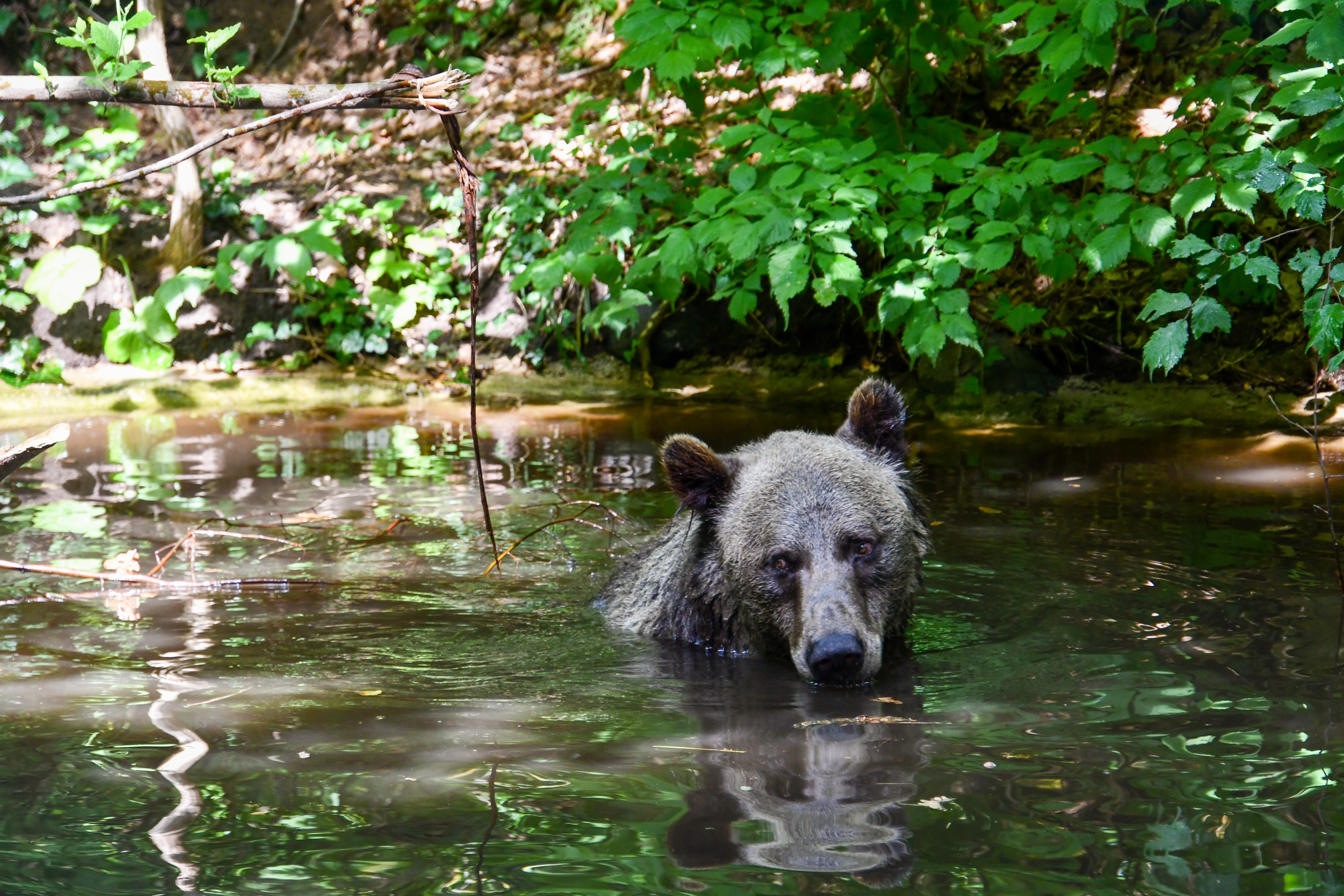

The Bear Sanctuary Müritz (German: Bärenwald Müritz) near Stuer in the north-east of Germany is a project that provides a species-appropriate home for mistreated and neglected captive bears.

== Background ==
Since 2006 Bear Sanctuary Müritz offers alternative accommodations for bears originating from poor keeping conditions in Germany. During this time, the sanctuary has also become home to bears from Poland, Albania and Serbia. It is the biggest bear sanctuary in Western Europe.

== Location and size ==
The sanctuary is situated in Mecklenburg Lake District area in the north-east of Germany. The park is on the southern tip of lake Plauer See, one of the largest lakes in this region. The sanctuary was named after the national park and lake Müritz, which is situated close to the sanctuary and is a well-known tourist destination. The sanctuary comprises 16 ha, of which 12 ha are built up with large outdoor enclosures that offer a varied landscape with mixed woodland, grasslands, forest glades, hillsides and a natural water course.

== Number and origin of bears ==
The sanctuary provides a home for brown bears that were kept in inadequate conditions in zoos, circuses or private captivity. Sixteen brown bears live in the outdoor enclosures. Some bears live in pairs or groups, whereas others prefer to live by themselves. A socialization process and evaluation take place before Four Paws experts decide to have bears live with one another permanently. The first bears that arrived on October 15, 2006, were "Lothar" and "Sindi". The most recent arrivals to the sanctuary are "Sylvia" and "Pavle", the last circus bears from Serbia who have lived at the sanctuary since November 2017. Other bears include Michal, Tapsi, Dushi, Felix, Rocco, Ida, Luna, Marei, Mascha, Otto, and Clara.

== Education and visitor service ==
Bear Sanctuary Müritz is open for visitors all year long. Visitors can take a walk through the park, experience the bears in their natural environment and learn more about wildlife species. Special visitor attractions established in recent years are the nature visitor trail, the "bear academy" and the "boulevard of the region".

== See also ==
- Bear Sanctuary Prishtina
- Bear Sanctuary Domazhyr
- Bear Sanctuary Ninh Binh
