= Tarabulus Zoo Park =

Park in Tripoli, Libya

Coordinates: 32.8621°N 13.1870°E

Tarabulus Zoo Park is a park in Tripoli, Libya, located to the south of Tripoli city center. Tripoli Zoo is in the south-west corner of the park, and the Rixos Al Nasr hotel is situated in its south-east corner.

Colonel Gaddafi's Bab al-Azizia complex is situated immediately to the north-east of the park.
