= Kaavan =

Sri Lankan elephant (born 1985)

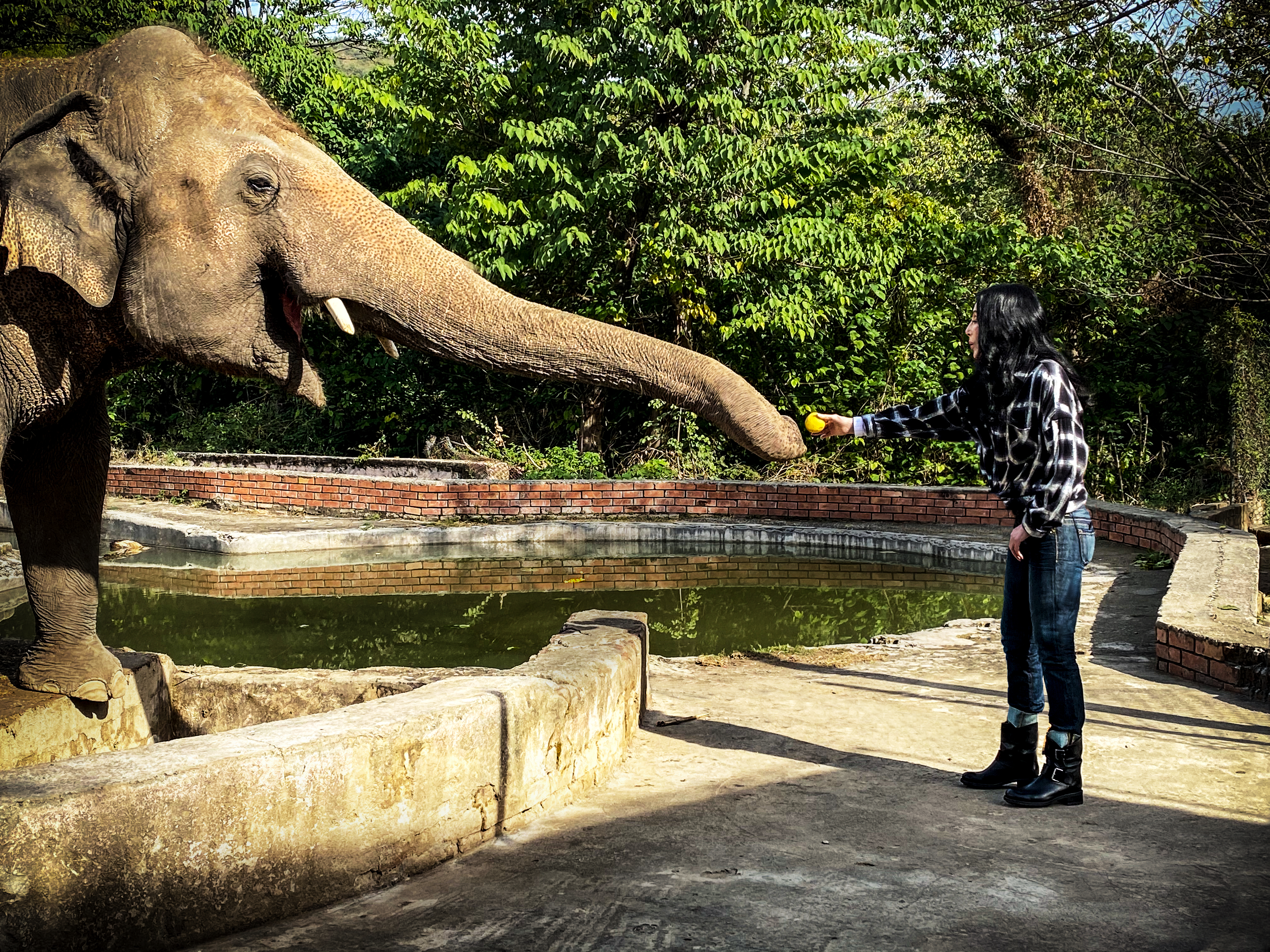
- Kaavan taking fruit from Cher in 2021
- Species: Asian elephant
- Sex: Male
- Born: 1985 (age 40–41); Sri Lanka
- Years active: 1985–2020 in Pakistan; 2020–present in Cambodia
- Known for: Lengthy captivity and eventual relocation after international campaign

Kaavan (Urdu: کاون; born 1985) is a male Asian elephant known as the "world's loneliest elephant" since his partner, 22-year-old Saheli, died in 2012. Kaavan was gifted by the government of Sri Lanka to Pakistan in 1985. He remained at the Islamabad Zoo until November 2020, when he was moved to a sanctuary in Cambodia, in response to a campaign launched by local and international animal rights activists, led by American singer Cher.

In May 2020, the Islamabad High Court ordered Kaavan to be released.

== Biography ==
Kaavan was born in Sri Lanka in 1985 and was kept at Pinnawala Elephant Orphanage. The Sri Lankan government gifted him to then-President of Pakistan, Muhammad Zia-ul-Haq, when Kaavan was one year old. The elephant was kept at the Islamabad Zoo and remained as the only Asian elephant living in Pakistan. An elephant named Saheli was brought from Bangladesh in 1990 as Kaavan's partner until her death in 2012.

== Campaign to free Kaavan ==
An American veterinarian, Samar Khan, visited Islamabad Zoo in 2015 and was disturbed by Kaavan's condition and environment. She started a petition on Change.org to plead for Kaavan's release to an elephant sanctuary. Khan's petition received more than 400,000 signatures and caught the attention of American singer Cher.

In response to the petition, zoo officials took some steps to improve Kaavan's care, such as providing additional water and removing his chains. Safwan Shahab Ahmad, the vice-chairman of Pakistan Wildlife Foundation, identified some of Kaavan's behavior as a kind of mental illness, possibly connected to the conditions in which he was kept. These included a pen too small for the elephant and a lack of shade and foliage. Officials at the zoo countered that Kaavan had been removed from restraints and just needed a new mate.

In September 2017, a news report highlighted the dire condition in which Kaavan was living, including being bound in chains for over two decades. A second petition requesting Kaavan's release gathered more than 200,000 signatures. Owais Awan, a Pakistani lawyer, sued the Islamabad Zoo to demand Kaavan’s release.

On 21 May 2020, the Islamabad High Court ruled that Kaavan should be freed and the zoo closed. It ordered wildlife officials to consult with Sri Lankan authorities to find a suitable sanctuary for Kaavan in another country within thirty days. The court also criticised the zoo officials for failing to meet the animal's needs in terms of the violation of the Prevention of Cruelty to Animals Act 1890 and Wildlife Ordinance of 1979.

== Relocation to Cambodia ==
On 17 July 2020, Free the Wild announced that the Pakistan government had ruled that FTW had their consent to relocate Kaavan to Lek's sanctuary in Cambodia—"A place we have personally visited and vetted and are delighted for Kaavan to call home". From September to November 2020, veterinarian Amir Khalil from the animal welfare organisation Four Paws, with the support of journalist and businessman Eric Margolis, Cher, and veterinarian Frank Goeritz from the Leibniz Institute for Zoo and Wildlife Research, examined and approved Kaavan for relocation to the Cambodia Wildlife Sanctuary.

Cher arrived in Pakistan to bid farewell to Kaavan and a ceremony was also organized at the Islamabad Zoo, which was attended by officials, activists, and members of the public. The President of Pakistan, Arif Alvi, and First Lady Samina Alvi, along with various ministers and delegates, also bid the elephant farewell. The move was completed on 30 November 2020.

In July 2021, the sanctuary completed construction of a "jungle home" with a pool, and Kaavan was introduced into the spacious new area.

== Cher & the Loneliest Elephant ==
In March 2021, Paramount+ announced the release of a documentary film, titled Cher & the Loneliest Elephant, detailing the singer's quest, alongside animal aid groups and veterinarians, to free Kaavan from confinement and have him transferred to a wildlife sanctuary. The film premiered on 22 April 2021 on the streaming platform and 19 May on the Smithsonian Channel.

== See also ==
- List of individual elephants
