= Cafe Chambord =

- Interactive map of Cafe Chambord

Restaurant information
- Established: 1936
- Location: New York City, New York, U.S.
- Coordinates: 40°45′42″N 73°58′28″W

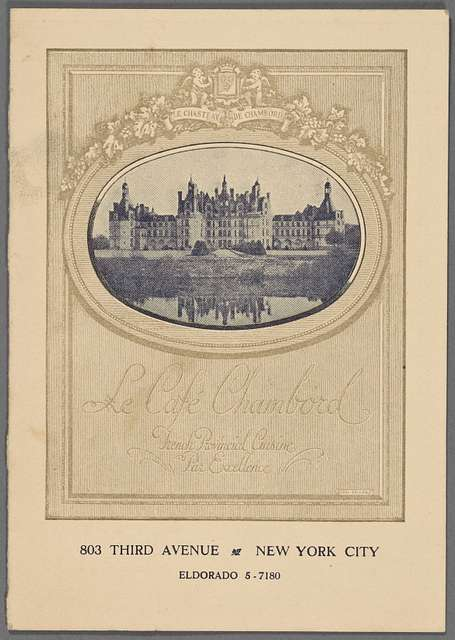
Cafe Chambord as shown on the menu

Cafe Chambord was a French haute cuisine restaurant in New York City, United States. Its original owner was Roger Chauveron who opened it in 1936 then sold it in 1950 to move to Deviat Charente, France.

== History ==
The Chambord was opened in 1936. It was located at 803 Third Avenue before moving to 5 East 55th Street in 1963; it closed in August 1964.

== Ownership ==
Roger Chauverson sold the restaurant in 1950 after inheriting a family estate in France. After five years in France, Chauveron sold the estate and returned to New York, opening the Cafe Chauveron in 1957. By the mid-1950s, the Chambord was co-owned by Henry Margolis, a New York entrepreneur and theatrical producer, and his partner Phil Rosen, who ran the restaurant on a daily basis. Margolis was often seen there entertaining theatrical friends like Orson Welles, Joseph Cotten, Margaret Sullavan and Martin Gabel.

Roger Chauveron died in 1983 in East Meadow, Long Island at the age of 82.

== See also ==
- List of French restaurants
