= Nexhmie Zaimi =

Albanian journalist (1917–2003)

Nexhmie Zaimi (born in Libohovë, Albania on 14 May 1917, died 18 April 2003 in Santa Barbara, California) was an Albanian American author and journalist.

== Early life and marriage ==
In Albania, when Zaimi was twelve and half years old, her father visited her in her bedroom and proceeded to tell her that she would have to begin wearing a veil whenever she went out of the house. When he handed her the veil, without saying a word, she opened the window and threw the scarf onto the neighbours roof where it remained for several days. Her father, angry, called her a "wild goat", the equivalent of tomboy in Albania, and left the room. This rebellious act would set the tone for Zaimi's adult life.

Nexhmie was one of the first six girls (along with her brother Mehmet) to attend high school in Albania, run by American Presbyterian missionaries. While a teenager in Albania, her traditional family tried to force her into marriage. She ran away from Albania and became the first female from Albania to achieve a higher education at Wellesley College. She lived with relief worker Florence Spencer Duryea and soon became an American citizen.

While attending Columbia University Graduate School of Journalism in New York City, she married Henry M. Margolis, an attorney and businessman, in the 1940s. They divorced in the early 1950s. She had one son, writer Eric Margolis.

== Work and publications ==
In 1938, her autobiographical book Daughter of the Eagle was published and became a national best-seller.

During World War II, she worked for the Office of Strategic Services (OSS) (predecessor of the Central Intelligence Agency). After the war, she took a very active role in Albanian-American affairs, becoming president of the Pan Albanian Association, Vatra. She aided Albanian immigrants and helped support her family in Albania.

In the early 1950s, she was one of the first American female journalists to report from the Middle East. She interviewed Egypt's leader, Gamal Abdel Nasser, Anwar Sadat, and Jordan's King Hussein. She was also one of the first journalists to write and lecture widely about the Palestinian refugees, whose plight was virtually unknown at the time in the United States. She delivered a study to the US State Department in which she warned that unless the problem of the Palestinian refugees was resolved, it would blow up in America's face in fifty years. Her broadcasting and speaking careers were terminated after the newspapers for whom she wrote were pressured into dropping her writing, and constant threats were made against her life and that of her young son.

During this period, Mrs Zaimi came down with severe glaucoma and other eye ailments that crippled her and prevented her from writing another book. She worked for the Albanian community in New York and New Jersey, translating at the New York Criminal Courts, and engaging in community activities and helping war refugees in Europe. She also lived for periods in Paris, Rome, Geneva, and Cairo. She was a strong voice in the US against Albania's Communist regime. Her Manhattan home was constantly filled with journalists, artists, writers, diplomats, UN personnel, and visitors from Europe and the Mideast. Due to the onset of blindness, Nexhmie Zaimi reluctantly left New York in the 1980s and moved to a retirement community in Santa Barbara, California. In her late 80s, she took over the care of three children from Kosovo who had been gravely injured by accident in a NATO airstrike. She continued to write her second book until her death. Remaining proud and defiant to the end, in 2003, her body finally gave out.

She returned to Albania twice for visits: the first time was in 1939, and the second time was in 1986 when she was expelled as persona non-grata by the communist authorities.

== Written works ==
Zaimi, Nexhmie (1937). Daughter of the eagle : the autobiography of an Albanian girl. I. Washburn, Inc. New York. p. 271. OCLC 2612893.
