= Florence Spencer Duryea =

Philanthropist and clubwoman

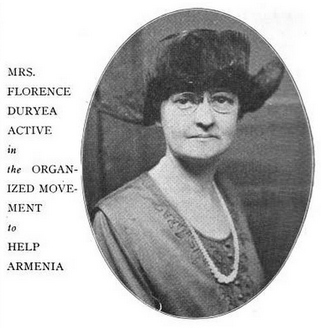
Florence Spencer Duryea, from a 1920 publication.

Florence Spencer Duryea (June 30, 1884 – 1966) was an American philanthropist and clubwoman, national secretary of Women's Organizations for Near East Relief, based in New York City.

== Personal life ==
Florence M. Spencer was born on June 30, 1884, and raised in Brooklyn, New York. After her mother's death when Mrs. Duryea 7 years old, she was raised by her grandmother and great grandmother. Hers was a proper Victorian/Edwardian upbringing, which instilled in her manners and morals she practiced throughout her life.

Florence M. Spencer married Edwin D. Duryea in 1911, in Brooklyn. They divorced in 1915. After her divorce, something of which she never spoke (because proper ladies were not supposed be divorced and she had opposed hers), she became involved in philanthropic pursuits.

She was an active Suffragette, and an active member of her church. She was a member of The Women's Club and the C.L.S.C. of Chautauqua Institution, New York, and also a member of The National Arts Club, New York City, where she resided for a time.

In her later life she lived with her daughter Alice (Esther Razon) and her daughter's family, first in New York City and later in New Jersey. She delighted in her grandchildren. Toward the end of her life she developed dementia/Alzheimer's and was lovingly cared for by Alice. She died in 1966 from pancreatic cancer.

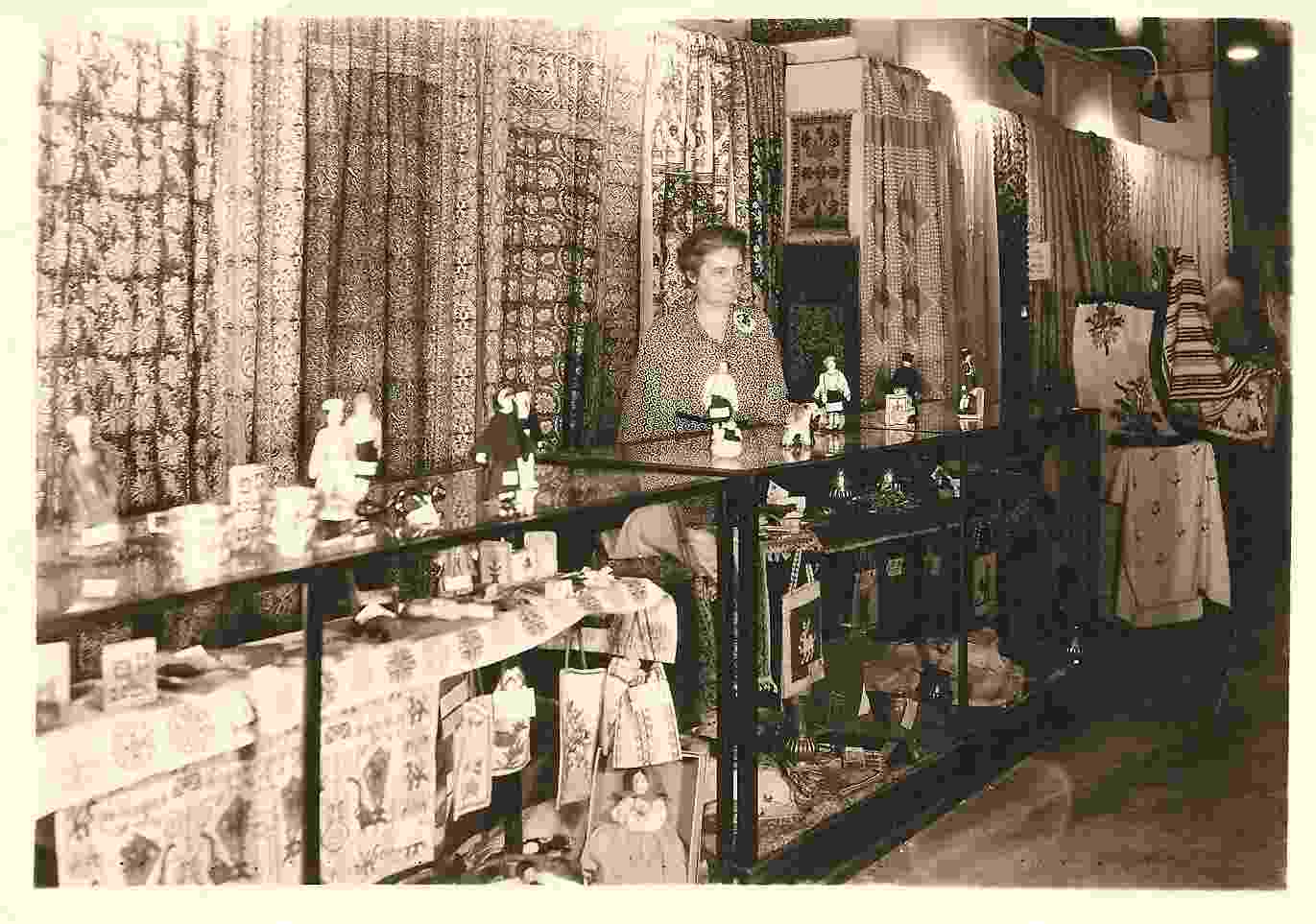
NER sale

== Career ==
Florence Spencer began working as a secretary to Rev. S. Parkes Cadman, and then worked in advertising for the Ipswich Mill Company. She was an active member of the New York League of Advertising Women, and a leader of the Salesmanship Club of New York.

From the late 1910s to the late 1940s, Mrs. Duryea raised funds, lectured, and publicized the work of the Near East Foundation in Greece, Turkey, Syria, Georgia, and Armenia. She spoke to women's clubs and highlighted the orphanages, schools, and rehabilitation programs they operated in cooperation with local committees. She also organized sales in America, of handicrafts by refugee women, to raise funds. "If more American women could only see the sights that I saw, of babies dying in their mothers' arms; of youngsters who still need a mother's care scratching in refuse for a morsel of something to eat; of others so shriveled up from starvation that they more resembled mummies from some ancient Egyptian tomb than anything human," Mrs. Duryea said in 1922, "if they could only see these sights, and worse, I know they would see that America did not forsake a task that up to this time has been so wonderfully done."

Florence Spencer Duryea adopted the child who starred in the 1921 film "Alice in Hungerland," produced by the Near East Foundation. There was controversy, as Rabbi Stephen Wise criticized the adoption, saying the Jewish orphan should be raised in a Jewish home. The girl, raised as Alice Duryea (later Alice Duryea Kinney), remained in Mrs. Duryea's care. Mrs. Duryea also mentored Albanian writer Nexhmie Zaimi after she settled in the United States.

In the late 1920s she was director of the extension division of the Chautauqua Institute.
