= Henry M. Margolis =

Henry Melville Margolis (November 2, 1909 – November 2, 1989) was a New York City industrialist, lawyer, theatrical producer, and philanthropist.

Margolis was born on New York's Lower East Side. He worked his way through City College of New York and New York University Law School, and was admitted to New York Bar. Margolis invested in hotels and property in New York City and New Jersey.

He married Nexhmie Zaimi in the 1940s. They had one son, Eric Margolis. He remarried in the 1950s to Irene Broza.

Margolis was part owner of a New York French restaurant, Cafe Chambord.

He was also a Broadway theatrical producer, sometimes with actor Martin Gabel: The Hidden River, Once More With Feeling, Tiger at the Gates and The Reclining Figure. With Orson Welles, he produced and staged King Lear in New York and Moby Dick—Rehearsed in London and New York.

Margolis was chairman of the Elgin National Watch Company. Later, he was chairman of Aero-Flow Dynamics Corp, and Jamieson Laboratories of Canada. His son, Eric, inherited Jamieson Laboratories and operated it until selling it in 2014.

Margolis was founding director of New York's International Center of Photography and California's Pritikin Foundation.

He died on his 80th birthday in black tie at Lincoln Center, November 2, 1989.
