= Bear Sanctuary Domazhyr =

Ukrainian national park

Coordinates: 49.9080°N 23.8030°E

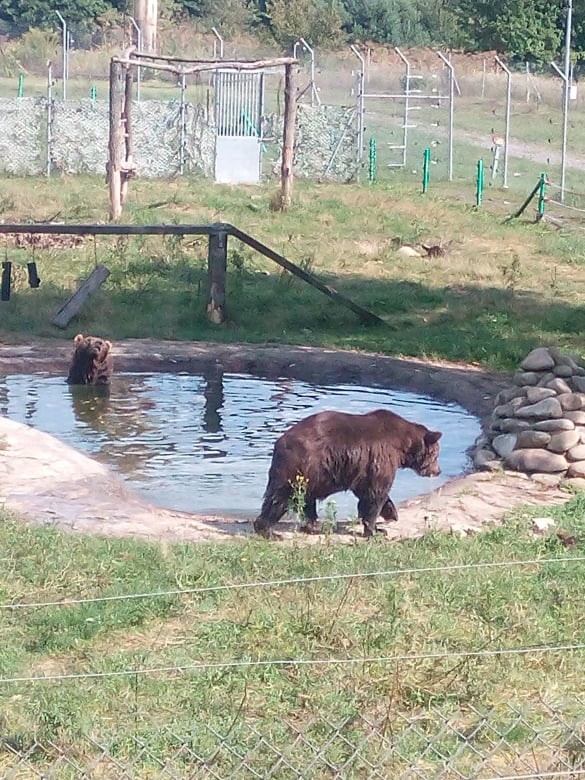
Picture is taken in 2021

The Bear Sanctuary Domazhyr is a national park and bear protected area in Ukraine that was founded in 2013 by an animal welfare organization Four Paws (Vienna, Austria) due to the abuse of bears for baiting and using illegally for dog fights on hunting stations.

== History and description ==
Four Paws began building a new bear sanctuary in summer 2016 for the purpose of housing baiting bears, in addition to housing individual animals from other forms of bear keeping. The first construction phase was finalised in autumn 2017. After all construction is completed, the sanctuary will have the capacity to house up to 30 bears.

Bear Sanctuary Domazhyr is situated in Western Ukraine, near Lviv, in the Unesco Roztochya Biosphere Reserve. The overall land plot area for establishing the sanctuary comprises approximately 20 hectare. The first finalised area of 7.7 hectare provides space for ten bears with three outdoor enclosures offering a natural environment for the bears, and four smaller outdoor enclosures for the adaptation of the bears following their rescue.

The sanctuary provides a home and care for ten Ukrainian brown bears. The first bear, Potap, was rescued and transferred to the sanctuary in July 2017, receiving the care by Four Paws keepers.

The sanctuary has been open for visitors since October 2017. Like all Four Paws, Bear Sanctuary Domazhyr offers guided tours and exhibition tools for environmental education.

== See also ==
- Bear Sanctuary Prishtina
