= Tripoli Zoo =

Coordinates: 32.8586°N 13.1789°E

- Interactive map of Tripoli Zoo
- Location: Tripoli

Tripoli Zoo (Arabic: حديقة حيوان طرابلس) is a zoological garden and botanical garden in Tripoli, Libya. Located south of Tripoli's city center adjacent to Tarabulus Zoo Park, it is a large reserve of plants, trees and open green spaces. It is the country's biggest zoo.

== Libyan Civil War ==
The zoo was forced to shut for safety reasons due to the Libyan Civil War, with many animals becoming more and more traumatised and distressed. After the overthrow of Muammar Gaddafi, the BBC published a short news film detailing the problems the zoo now faced, from a lack of money to feed the animals, to a fragile security system. The animals, the BBC said, were recovering slowly and returning to normal.

In 2013, parts of the zoo were transformed into a detention center for immigrants, who were reported in several cases to be arbitrarily arrested and tortured in the zoo. Immigrants were also locked up in cages.

As of March 2025, the zoo was still closed, but "planned to reopen under new management". Following armed clashes in May 2025, various zoo animals including lions and antelopes were slaughtered or stolen.

As of late 2025, Due to the death of an influential leader going by the name of Abdelghani Al-Kikli, the Zoo was reopened under new management. Though missing a few animals, the Zoo remains in operation and currently also serves as one of Abu Salim's local and tourist attractions.
