= Roztochia Biosphere Reserve =

Nature reserve in Lviv Oblast, Ukraine

Roztochia reserve
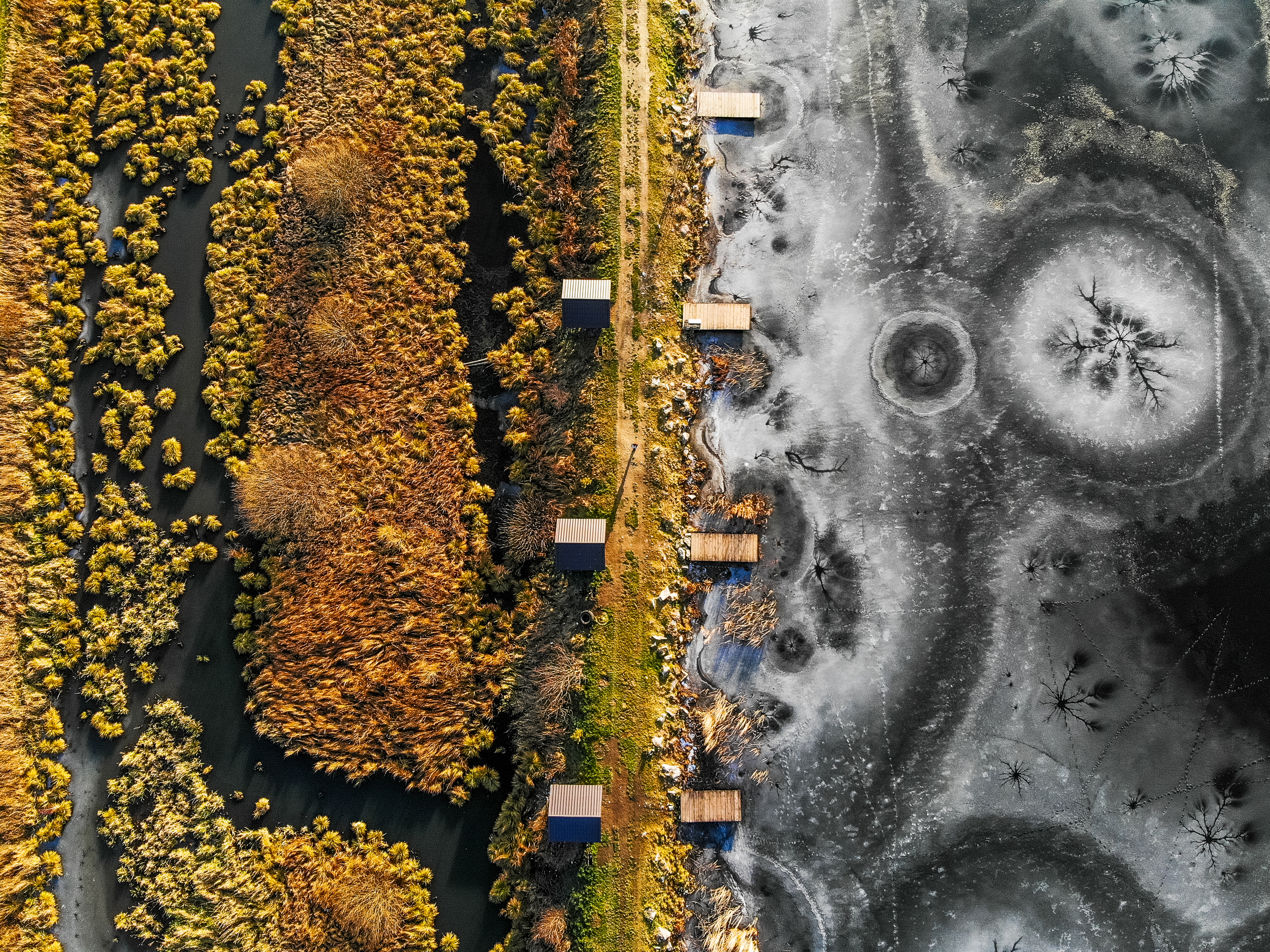
- Roztochia reserve, view from drone, 2019

- Location within Ukraine
- Nearest city: Lviv, Ukraine
- Coordinates: 50°1′0″N 23°37′0″E
- Area: 2,084.5 hectares (8.048 sq mi)
- Established: 2011
- Website: wownature.in.ua/en/roztochia-nature-reserve/

The Roztochia reserve (Ukrainian: Природний заповідник «Розточчя», romanized: Roztochchia or Roztochchya, established in 2011) is a UNESCO Biosphere Reserve in Ukraine. Roztochia has a total size of 74,800 hectares (289 sq mi) with its main economic activities including agriculture, stock-breeding and fish farming. The site is located on the north-western edge of the Podillya Upland, 20 kilometres (12 mi) from the city of Lviv, with an area of 30,000 hectares (120 sq mi). The site attracts visitors to its sanatoria and there are plans for developing business and tourism. There is on-going and planned cooperation with Poland in the Roztochia region; in 2019 Roztocze Transboundary Biosphere Reserve, Poland/Ukraine became a designated UNESCO site.

== Gallery ==
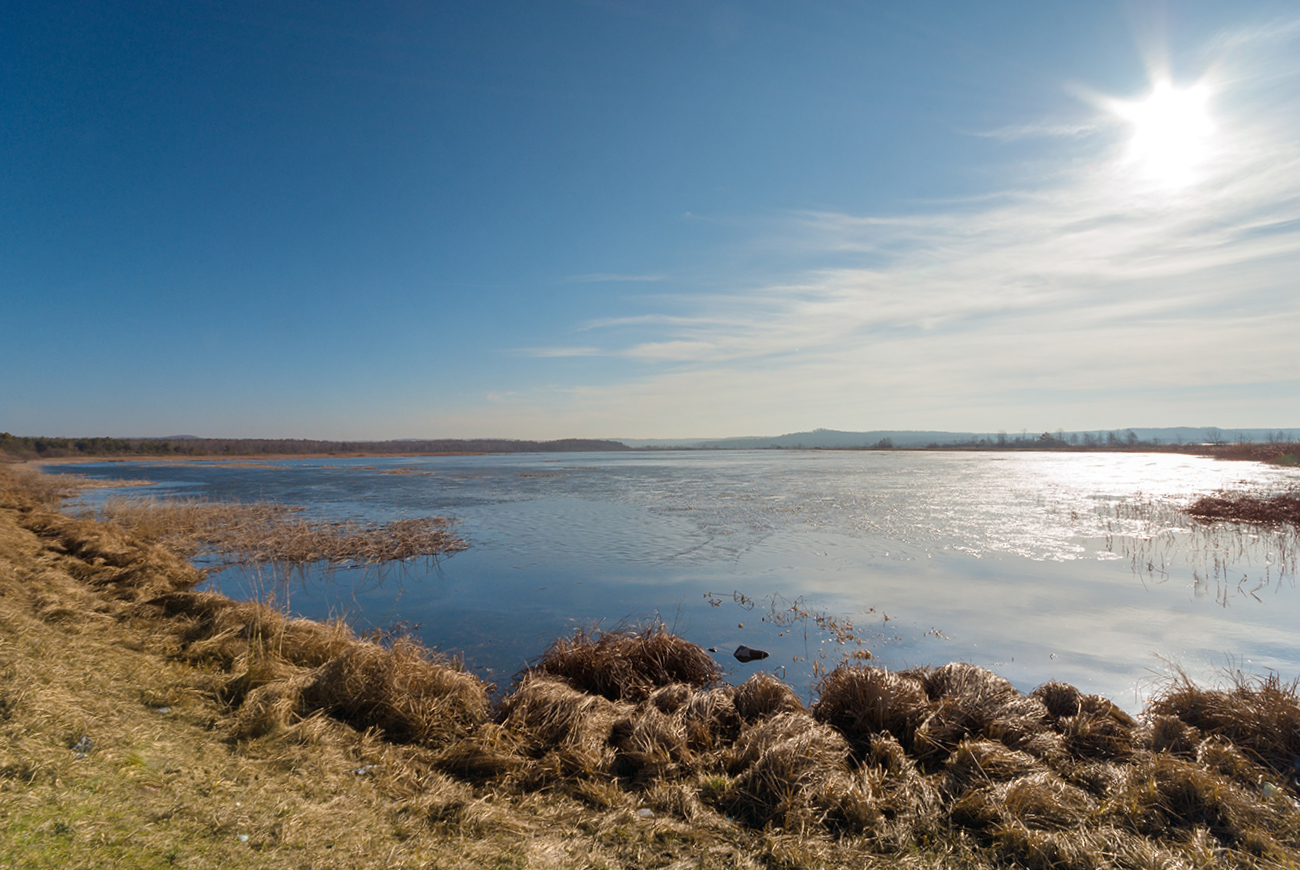

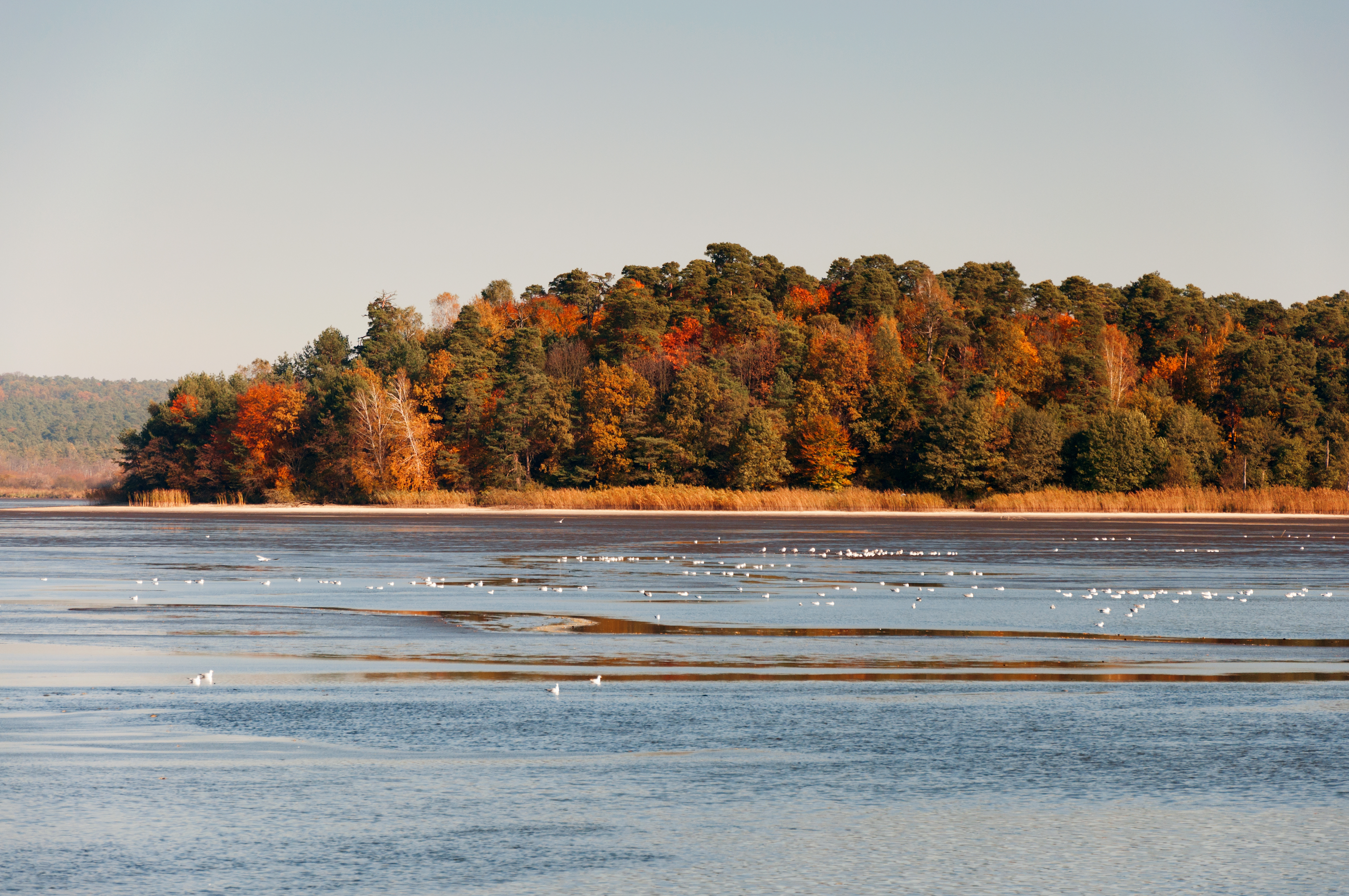

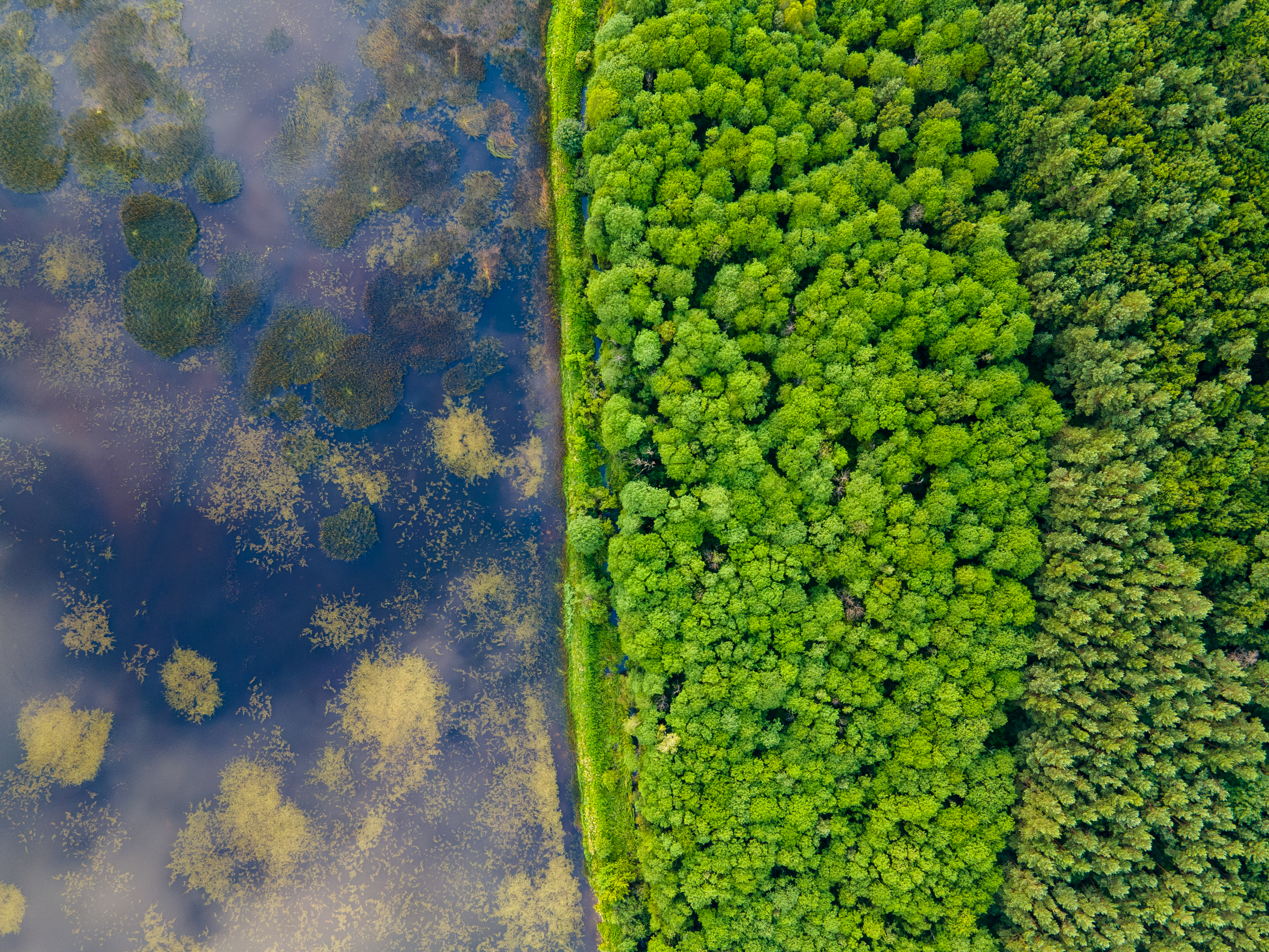
