= Eric Margolis (journalist) =

American journalist and writer (born 1943)

Eric S. Margolis
- Born: Eric S. Margolis; 1943 (age 82–83); New York City, U.S.
- Education: Georgetown University; University of Geneva; New York University
- Occupation: Journalist

Eric S. Margolis (born 1943) is an American-born journalist and writer. For 27 years, ending in 2010, he was a contributing editor to the Toronto Sun chain of newspapers, writing mainly about the Middle East, South Asia and Islam. He contributed to the Huffington Post until 2017 and appears frequently on Canadian television broadcasts, as well as on CNN. A multinational, he holds residences in New York, Paris, Toronto and Banff, Alberta, Canada. Margolis inherited Canadian vitamin manufacturer Jamieson Laboratories from his father in 1989 and owned it until 2014, when he sold it to a US private equity firm.

== Biography ==
=== Background ===
Margolis was born in New York City in 1943 to Henry M. Margolis, a Jewish-American and Nexhmie Zaimi, an American-Albanian. His father was a New York businessman, restaurant owner, theatrical producer and investor, while his mother was a journalist and author. Eric Margolis holds degrees from the School of Foreign Service at Georgetown University, the University of Geneva, Switzerland, and New York University's MBA Program.

=== Journalism ===
Margolis previously wrote a regular column for the Sun chain of newspapers in Canada until 2010, and the Huffington Post until 2017. He has also written for Pakistan's Dawn newspaper, an English language Pakistani newspaper, the Gulf Times in Qatar, the Khaleej Times in Dubai, The New York Times and The American Conservative. He appeared regularly on such television outlets as CNN, Fox, CBC, British Sky Broadcasting News, NPR, and CTV. He was a regular guest on TV Ontario's The Agenda after previously regularly appearing on its predecessor programme Studio 2.

He is affiliated with several organizations including International Institute of Strategic Studies in London and the Institute of Regional Studies based in Islamabad, Pakistan.

=== Animal rights ===
Margolis and his wife Dana have been animal rights activists for several decades. Together they created the charity The Eric S. Margolis Family Foundation which works to prevent animal cruelty and focuses on issues such as factory farming, puppy mills, and elephant poaching. In summer 2019, Margolis donated $16,000 to cover the veterinarian costs of helping a puppy in critical condition that was thrown from a 6th floor condominium balcony in Toronto and was actively involved in the rescue of the elephant Kaavan from the Islamabad Zoo in Pakistan, together with Four Paws International and Free the Wild Foundation.

== Work ==
=== Political views on United States ===
Margolis identifies his politics as "Eisenhower Republican". Though his domestic political persuasion is moderately conservative (he is an anti-communist and a supporter of capitalism), Margolis' views on the Middle East are sharply at odds with those of the neoconservatives.

Margolis wrote this about Barack Obama's election:

Americans did not "liberate" Iraq, but they certainly liberated their own nation last week by sweeping the Republican Party from power. One prays America's long nightmare of foreign aggressions, fear, religious extremism, and flirting with neo-fascism is finally at an end.

In a 2009 column, Margolis stated that an American politician he very much admires is Ron Paul. Margolis wrote about Paul:

I came to deeply respect and admire Paul's courage, honesty, and his refusal to accept special interest money ... In fact, Rep. Paul has been a model of the type of legislators envisaged by America's founding fathers: men of high moral standards and intellect dedicated to the nation's wellbeing. He reminds me in many ways of the fiercely upright senators of the early Roman Republic.

Margolis has said he rejects the Republican Party of 2010 because of the growing influence of the Tea Party movement, which he says now appeals to the fears and prejudices of its followers.

=== Middle East ===
Margolis is best known from his coverage of Palestine and Kashmir. Margolis' mother, Nexhmie Zaimi, was also a journalist who spent a long time in the Middle East documenting the plight of the Palestinians during the 1950s. Her influence, plus Margolis's role as a foreign correspondent in the Mideast and travelling with the mujahideen during the Soviet–Afghan War, invested Margolis with a strong interest in the Muslim World. In a January 2009 column entitled "Eradicating Hamas", Margolis called the Gaza War a "final solution campaign" on the part of Israel, and called Hamas a popular revolutionary movement that had stood up for the rights of Palestinians "ethnically cleansed" in 1948.

=== World history ===
In a November 2008 book review entitled "Deflating the Churchill Myth", Margolis in the Toronto Sun endorsed Pat Buchanan's book Churchill, Hitler and the Unnecessary War as a "powerful new book". Margolis stated:

Buchanan's heretical view, and mine, is that the Western democracies should have let Hitler expand his Reich eastward until it inevitably went to war with the even more dangerous Soviet Union. Once these despotisms had exhausted themselves, the Western democracies would have been left dominating Europe. The lives of millions of Western civilians and soldiers would have been spared.

In a 2009 essay entitled "Don't Blame Hitler Alone for World War II", Margolis endorsed the claims of Viktor Suvorov that Operation Barbarossa was a "preventive war" forced on Hitler by an alleged impending Soviet attack, and that it is wrong to give Hitler "total blame" for World War II.

== Publications ==
- War at the Top of the World: The Struggle for Afghanistan, Kashmir, and Tibet (ISBN 0-415-93062-6) Routledge 1999
- American Raj: The West and the Muslim World (ISBN 1-554-70087-6) Key Porter September, 2008. Finalist in English non-fiction category at 2009 Governor General's Awards for Literary Merit.
