= Arbesbach =

Municipality in Lower Austria

- Municipality
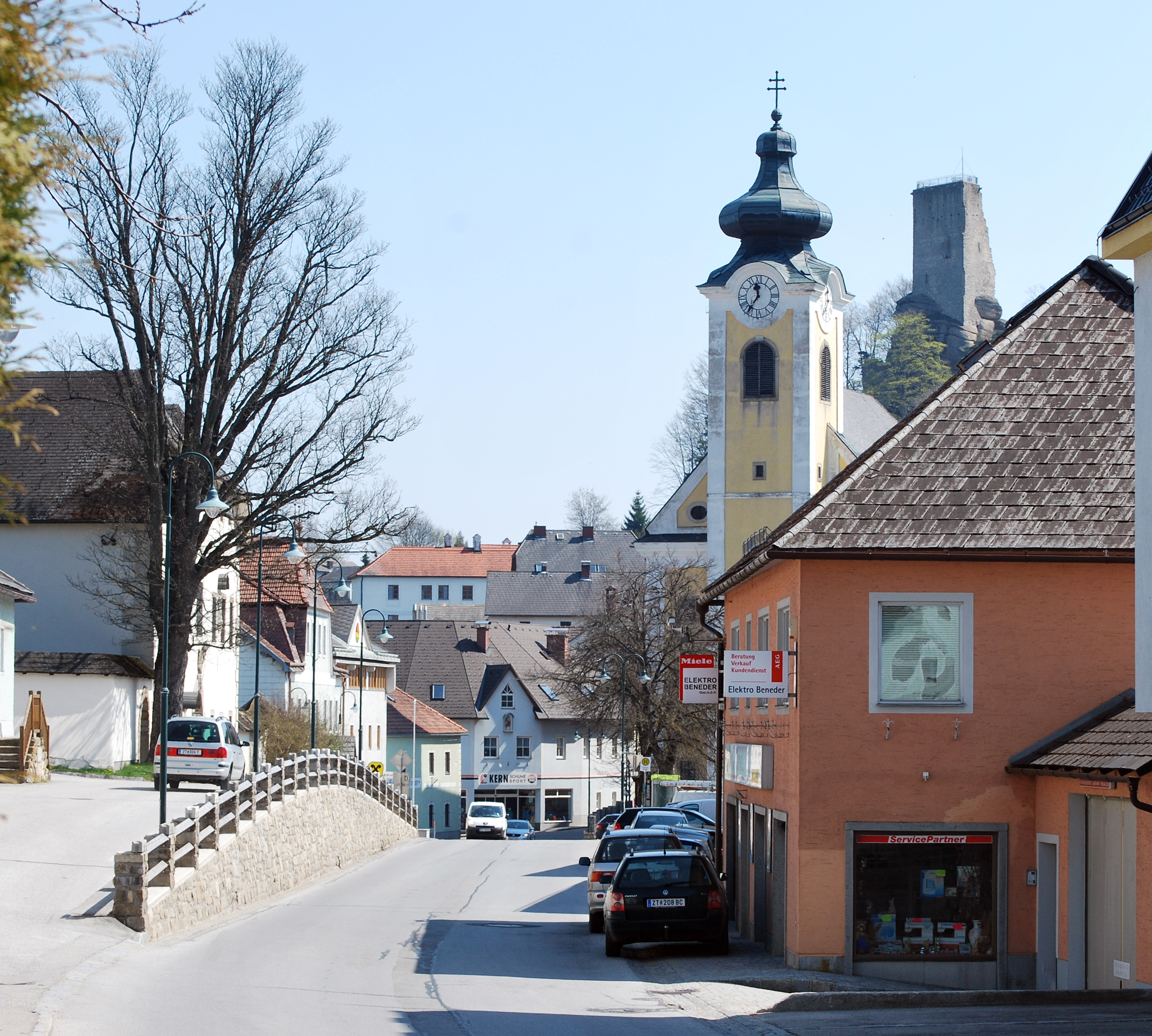
- Arbesbach town centre

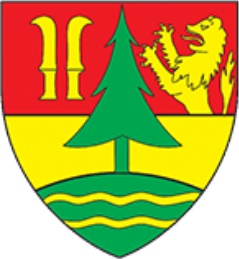
- Coat of arms

- Location within Austria
- Coordinates: 48°28′00″N 14°56′00″E
- Country: Austria
- State: Lower Austria
- District: Zwettl

Government
  - Mayor: Josef Weidmann (ÖVP)

Area
  - Total: 55.03 km^{2} (21.25 sq mi)
- Elevation: 849 m (2,785 ft)

Population (2023-01-01)
  - Total: 1,587
  - Density: 28.84/km^{2} (74.69/sq mi)
- Time zone: UTC+1 (CET)
  - Summer (DST): UTC+2 (CEST)
- Postal code: 3925
- Area code: 02813
- Vehicle registration: ZT
- Website: www.arbesbach.gv.at

Arbesbach is an Austrian municipality in the district of Zwettl in the Austrian state of Lower Austria.

== Population ==
Historical population
Year	Pop.	±%
1971	1,770	—
1981	1,836	+3.7%
1991	1,841	+0.3%
2001	1,785	−3.0%
