= Bear Sanctuary Ninh Binh =

Animal sanctuary in Vietnam

Bear Sanctuary Ninh Binh is located in Ninh Bình province, Vietnam, and was completed in December 2017. The establishment, run by the Austrian animal welfare organization Four Paws, rescues bears held in captivity, primarily for the production of bear bile and the illegal trade in other bear products.

== History and description ==
With Bear Sanctuary Ninh Binh, Four Paws aims to end bear farming in Vietnam. The refuge allows the government to enforce existing laws prohibiting the abuse of bears for bile extraction by providing a place for them to be cared for.

The sanctuary is located in Ninh Bình province, in northern Vietnam. The first phase comprises 3.6 hectares, with four natural, outdoor enclosures, two bear houses, a quarantine area, and a veterinary clinic. Two further phases are either underway or planned, for a total of 10 hectares.

Bear Sanctuary Ninh Binh has species-appropriate habitats for up to 44 Asiatic black bears. The first three were brought there in November 2017. In January 2018, another Asiatic black bear was transferred to the refuge. In April 2018, the last two bile bears in the province of Ninh Binh were rescued and transferred to the sanctuary. Once the remaining two phases of construction are complete, the establishment will be able to accommodate 100 bears.

Bear Sanctuary Ninh Binh opened to visitors in January 2019. Unlike other Four Paws centers, visitors can tour the entire sanctuary.

== See also ==
- List of bear sanctuaries
