= Brigitte Bardot Foundation =

French animal protection foundation

Fondation Brigitte Bardot
- Fondation Brigitte Bardot
- Abbreviation: FBB
- Founded: 1986
- Founder: Brigitte Bardot
- Type: Foundation
- Legal status: Recognised as a public utility foundation (France)
- Purpose: Animal welfare Animal rights
- Headquarters: 28, rue Vineuse; 75116 Paris, France
- Region served: France and international
- Methods: Lobbying; Animal shelter Campaigning; International support to partner NGOs
- Members: 75,000
- Website: fondationbrigittebardot.fr

The Fondation Brigitte Bardot (Fondation Brigitte Bardot; FBB) is a French animal-protection foundation created in 1986 by actress and activist Brigitte Bardot. It has been recognised in France as a foundation “of public utility” (French: Déclaration d'utilité publique) since 21 February 1992. The foundation’s work spans sheltering and rescuing animals, advocacy and public campaigning in France and internationally, and support for partner organisations.

== History ==
Bardot's initial involvement with animal rights was in 1962, after seeing photographs of the conditions in which animals were killed. Upon this, Bardot immediately began advocating against the use of painful electric shock pistols in slaughterhouses, and became a vegetarian. In 1967, Bardot was received at the Élysée Palace where she met with Charles de Gaulle, the then president of France. It was a few years later that Bardot obtained the "stunning before slaughter" rights from the government.

In 1977, Bardot went on to campaign against the hunting of baby Harp seals. Upon invitation from Paul Watson, of the Sea Shepherd Conservation Society, Bardot embarked on a five day trip to the ice fields in Blanc-Sablon, Canada, receiving significant media attention. In addition, the trip also gained Bardot the support of French president, Valéry Giscard d'Estaing, leading to changes regarding the import of seal products.

=== Launch and recognition as public utility (1986–1992) ===
The foundation was created in 1986 in Saint-Tropez. Contemporary reporting and later accounts describe Bardot financing the launch through an auction of personal items and jewellery in order to raise the initial capital required for the organisation.

In 1988, the foundation moved its headquarters to Paris. In 1991, Bardot donated her Saint-Tropez property La Madrague to increase the foundation’s capital, a step taken in connection with obtaining official recognition as a public utility foundation. The recognition was granted on 21 February 1992.

In 1991, Bardot donated her Saint Tropez property, La Madrague, to the foundation so as to raise the capital required to obtain a declaration of public utility. The declaration was granted on 21 February 1992, by the Conseil d'État.

=== Development and oversight (1993–present) ===
In 1995, the Dalai Lama became an honorary member of the foundation.

In 2019, the French Court of Audit (Cour des comptes) publicly criticised the foundation for governance dysfunctions and insufficient transparency towards donors, prompting renewed media attention to its management practices.

== Activities ==
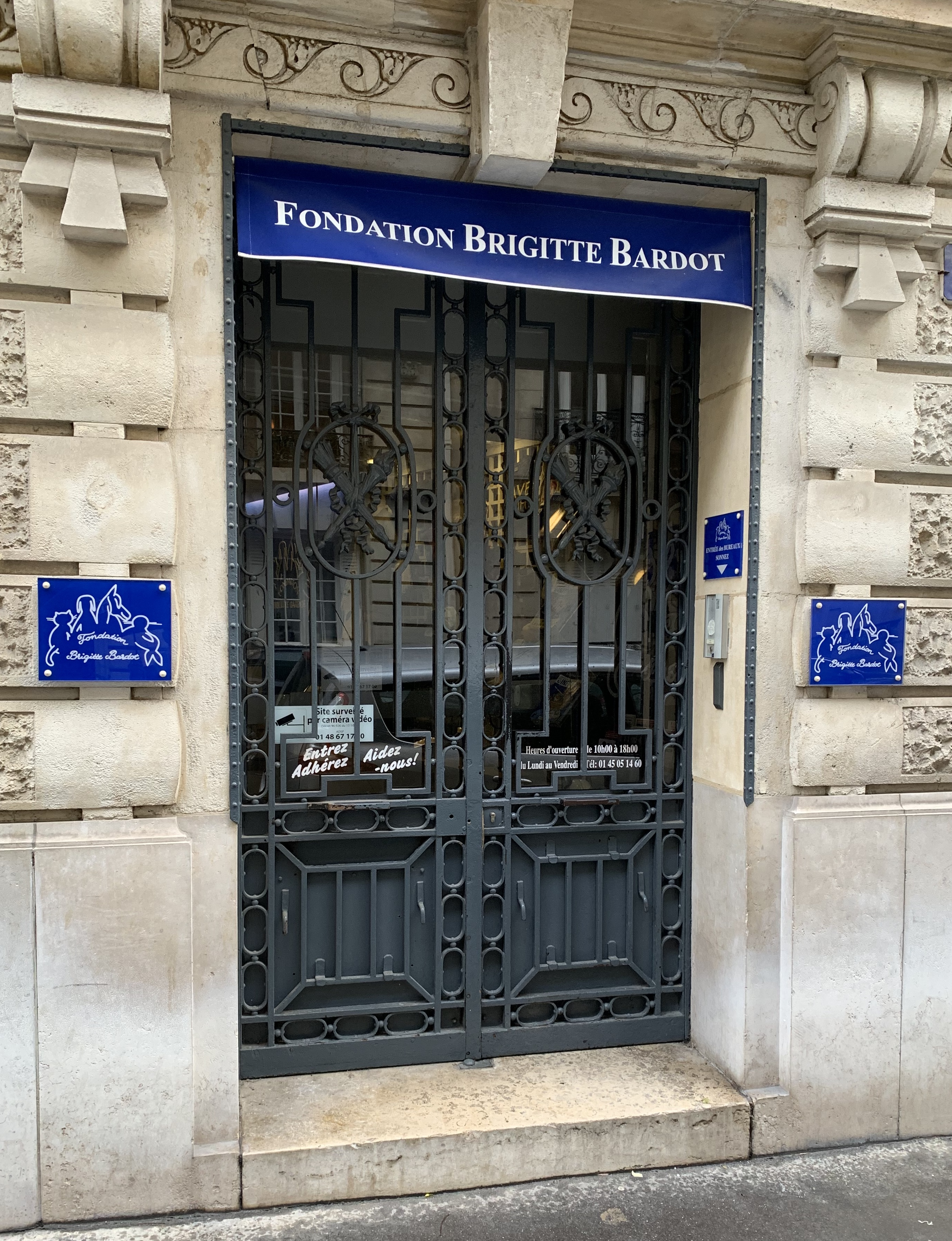
The Fondation Brigitte Bardot headquarters in Paris (2019).

The foundation has helped create shelters for elephants in South Africa, koalas in Australia, dancing bears in Bulgaria, and primates in Cameroon. It has also reintroduced several animal species that had completely disappeared in Senegal and participated in the reintroduction of wolves to the Alps. A mobile veterinary clinic has also been created for the Eastern Bloc countries.

The foundation is a regular plaintiff in lawsuits against animal cruelty. In January 2016, to support the proposition of a law to ban force-feeding on ducks and geese, the foundation invited Pamela Anderson to speak at the French National Assembly.

While funding other French animal shelters, the foundation has also created its own shelter, La Mare Anzou, located in a ruined mansion in the department of Eure in Normandy. It covers several hectares, where 200 dogs and 250 cats wait for adoption. This shelter is also a "retirement home" for several horses, cows, etc. After complaints from local residents about noise nuisance threatened to close the shelter in 2009, the foundation began soundproofing construction, investing 3 million euros to date.

In 2009, the foundation launched a campaign against hippophagy titled Le cheval vous l'aimez comment? ( "The horse, how do you like it?"). The foundation was banned from the Salon du Cheval (Paris Horse Show), the organizers of the event stating, "This is not a place to develop a view point on hippophagy". In the winter of this year, the foundation launched Fourrure: signe extérieur de cruauté ("Fur: external sign of cruelty"), a national campaign of posters and television spots against fur. The French fur association attempted to ban these advertisements, without success. In December 2005, a new communication campaign Fourrure, le look qui tue ("Fur, the look that kills") was launched in France. The foundation has also supported the yearly "day without fur," on every first Saturday of winter sales since 2007.

In 2011, the boat MV Brigitte Bardot, co-financed by the foundation and the Sea Shepherd Conservation Society of Paul Watson, was damaged by a wave. It was repaired and put back on the water the next year. In 2015, it was exhibited in Paris after a campaign in the Faroe Islands to save the cetaceans.

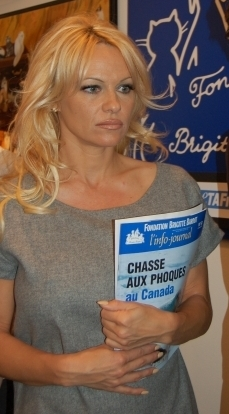
Pamela Anderson at the Fondation Brigitte Bardot (2008), speaking out against seal hunting.

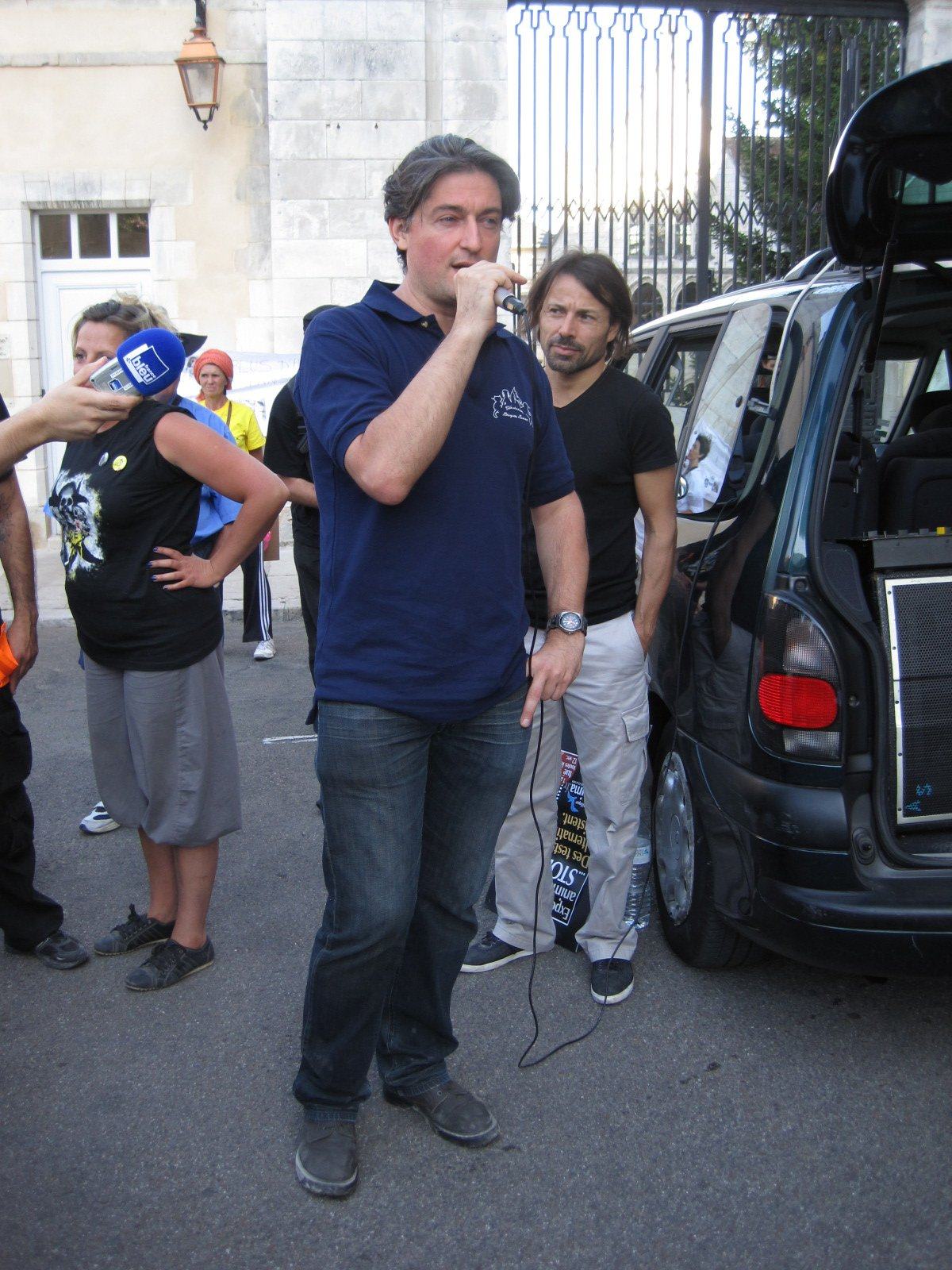
Christophe Marie, spokesperson for the Fondation Brigitte Bardot (2012).

== Facilities ==
The foundation owns and operates animal shelters in France and provides financial support to other refuges. One of its best-known facilities is La Mare Auzou in the department of Eure (Normandy), described in French media as a large refuge receiving dogs, cats and other animals awaiting adoption.

== Newsletter and public statements ==
Since 1992 the foundation has published a quarterly newsletter, L'Info-journal.

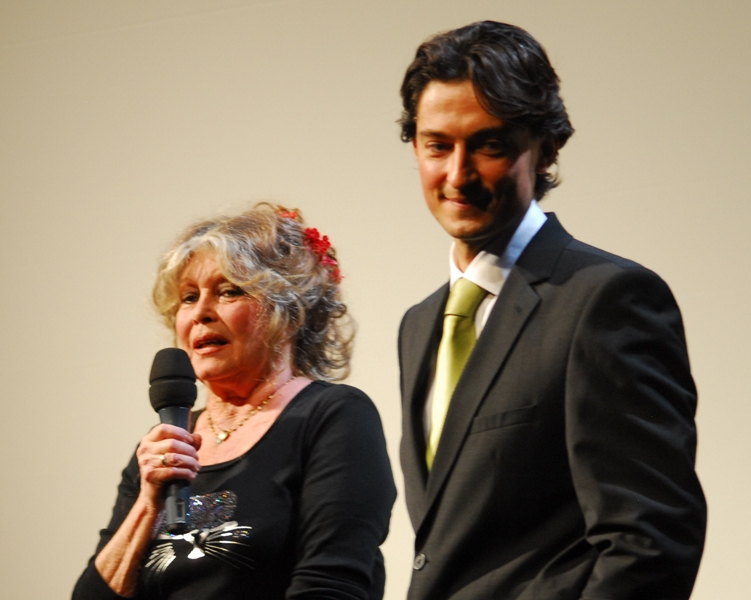
Brigitte Bardot and Christophe Marie in 2006

On 23 December 2006, Brigitte Bardot published a letter to Nicolas Sarkozy in the Foundation's newsletter, L'info-journal (published every trimester since 1992), condemning the practice of the Eid al-Adha in France. This caused her be charged with and later fined for incitement to racial hatred.

== Goals ==
The foundation lists a range of animal-protection priorities, including opposition to the captivity of wild animals (for example in circuses), the fur trade, hippophagy, long-distance transport of livestock, animal experimentation, poaching, animal fighting, and campaigns related to whaling, seal hunting, and the management of stray animals (including sterilisation programmes).

== See also ==
- Brigitte Bardot
- Animal rights
- Animal welfare
