= Bear Sanctuary Prishtina =

Bear sanctuary in Kosovo

Coordinates: 42°38′17″N 21°15′36″E

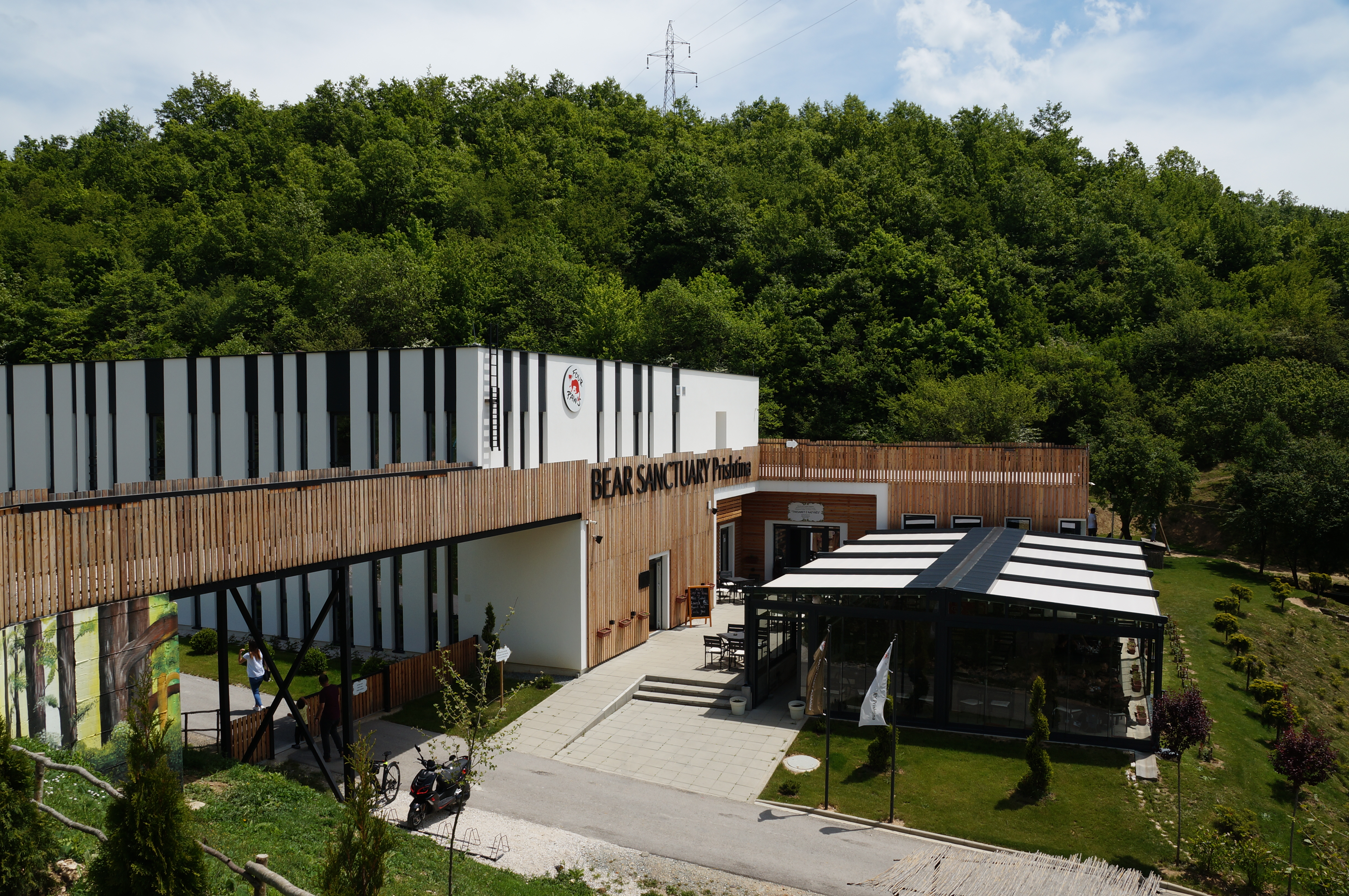
- The building of the sanctuary
- Interactive map of Bear Sanctuary Prishtina
- Date opened: May 2013; 13 years ago
- Location: Badoc Lake
- Land area: 16 hectares (40 acres)
- No. of animals: 19 brown bears
- Director: Afrim Mahmuti
- Public transit: Trafiku Urban
- Website: https://www.bearsanctuary-prishtina.org/

The Bear Sanctuary Prishtina (Albanian: Pylli i arinjve Prishtina) is a sanctuary for rescued brown bears in Kosovo at around 22 km (14 mi) close to the city of Pristina. The sanctuary is located near the Badoc Lake.

== Background ==
For many years, there was no law against keeping brown bears in Kosovo. All privately kept brown bears lived in small cages at restaurants. They were born mostly in the forests of Kosovo or Albania and taken from their mothers by animal dealers. As restaurant bears they were supposed to attract customers, and thus profit, for their owners. In November 2010, when it became illegal to keep bears privately, there was a need for a national park as a new home for the restaurant bears rescued from captivity.

== Park ==
=== Foundation ===
The Bear Sanctuary Prishtina was founded in 2013 by Four Paws in collaboration with KFOR, the Municipality of Pristina, and the Ministry of Environment in Kosovo. The sanctuary provides species-appropriate place for all "restaurant bears", who now live in large enclosures resembling the bears’ natural habitat.

Construction of the sanctuary began in 2012 in partnership with Four Paws. After rescuing several bears in the spring of 2013, the sanctuary officially opened for visitors in May 2013.

=== Facilities ===
The sanctuary is built on an area of sixteen hectares. In addition to the existing facilities, a new environmental education center "Thesaret e Natyrës" was opened in 2018 in order to improve the public attention to animal welfare and environmental issues in Kosovo.

The sanctuary features youth activities like a maze, playground, and treasure hunt, alongside a vegetarian-friendly restaurant. It actively promotes animal rights through educational campaigns and hosts school field trips from Kosovo and Albania to raise awareness about environmental conservation and the ethical treatment of animals.

In 2023, it was reported that the sanctuary welcomed over 40,000 visitors annually.

=== Rescued animals ===
As of November 2023, the sanctuary had 20 brown bears in its care. Most of the bears arrived in 2013 through a Four Paws initiative to rescue Kosovo's restaurant bears, many of whom suffered severe mental health issues from prolonged captivity. Three sibling bears, however, were rescued from two houses in Peja in March 2014 at just six weeks old. According to the sanctuary, four or five of the bears only partially hibernate due to their lack of experience with life in the wild, while 16 other bears at the sanctuary undergo full hibernation.

In 2022, a lion named Gjon was rescued from a local restaurant where it had been kept to entertain customers.

The sanctuary faces challenges due to Kosovo's unrecognized status, which prevents participation in international agreements like CITES. As a result, Kosovo cannot transport large animals, leaving the sanctuary unable to relocate certain rescued animals.

== Gallery ==
Photos of the Bear Sanctuary Prishtina

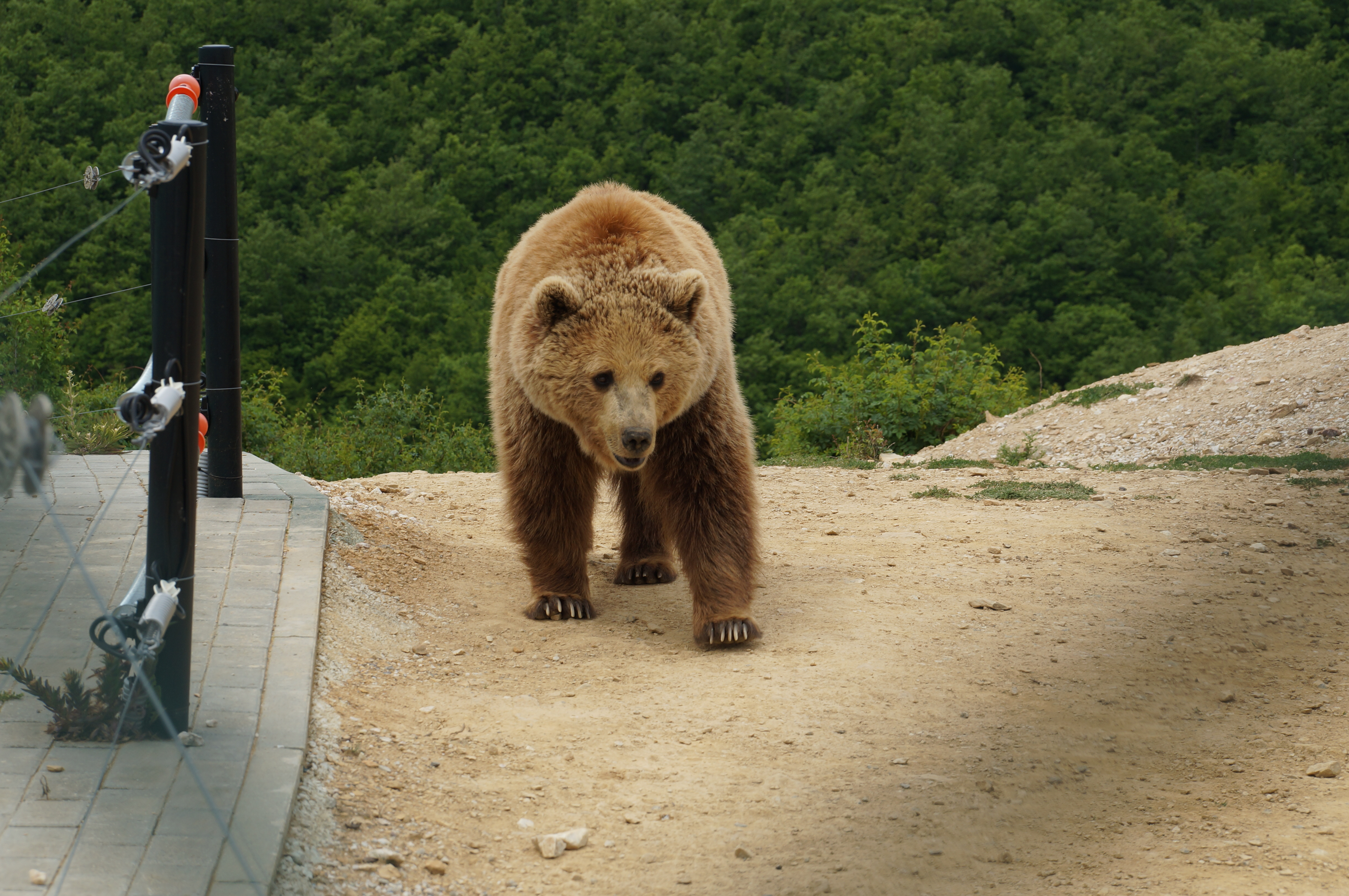
Adult bear in its enclosure at the sanctuary

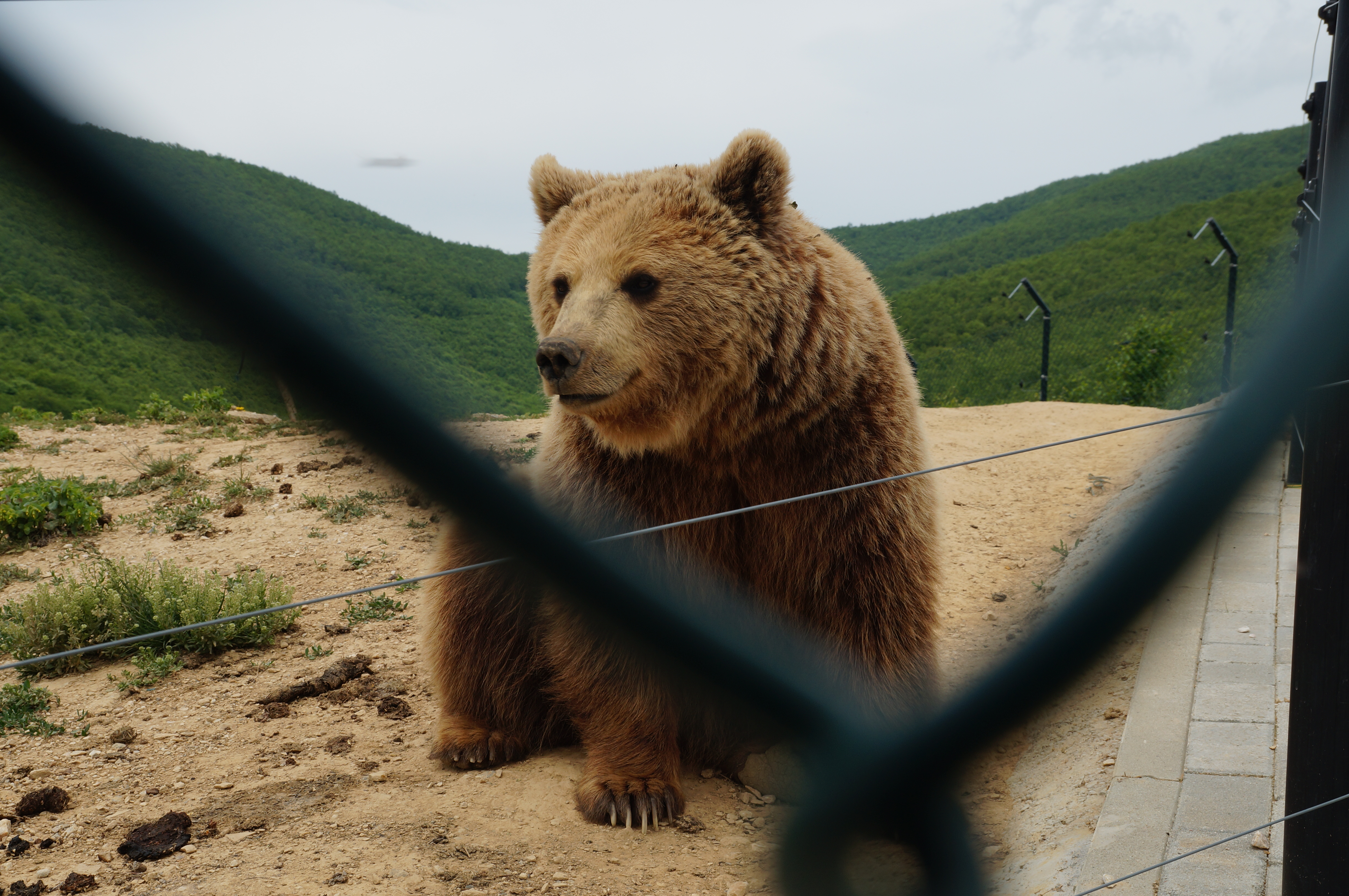
Adult bear in its enclosure at the sanctuary

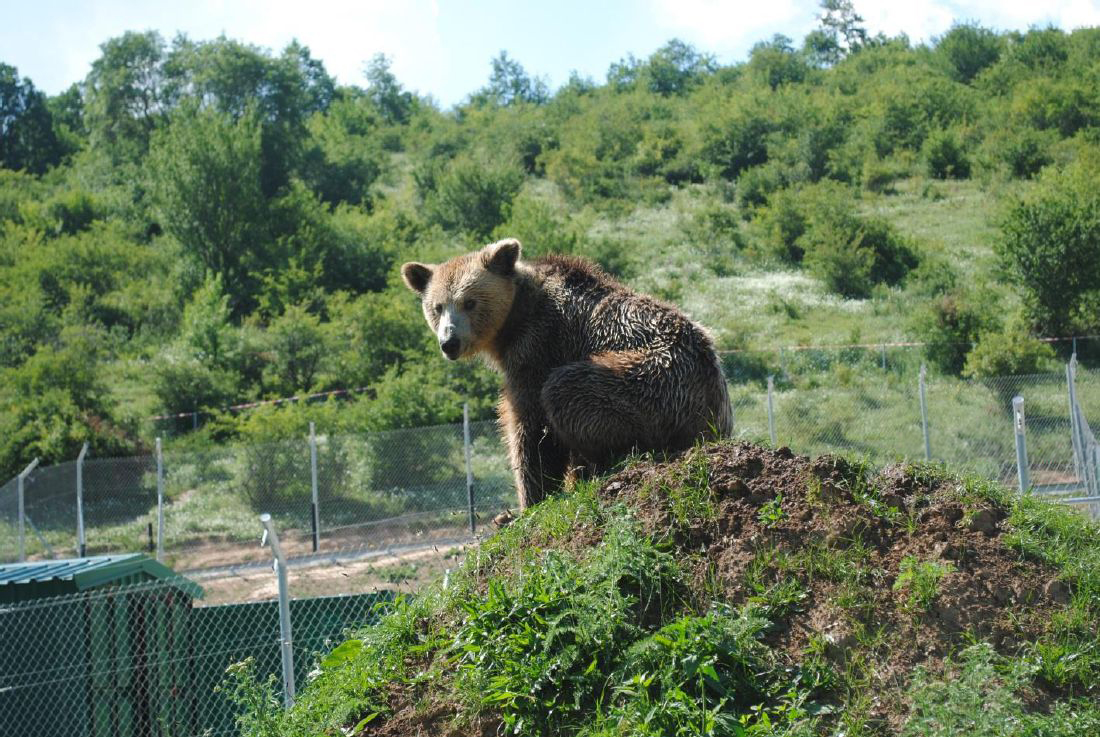
Adult bear sitting on a mound in its enclosure at the sanctuary

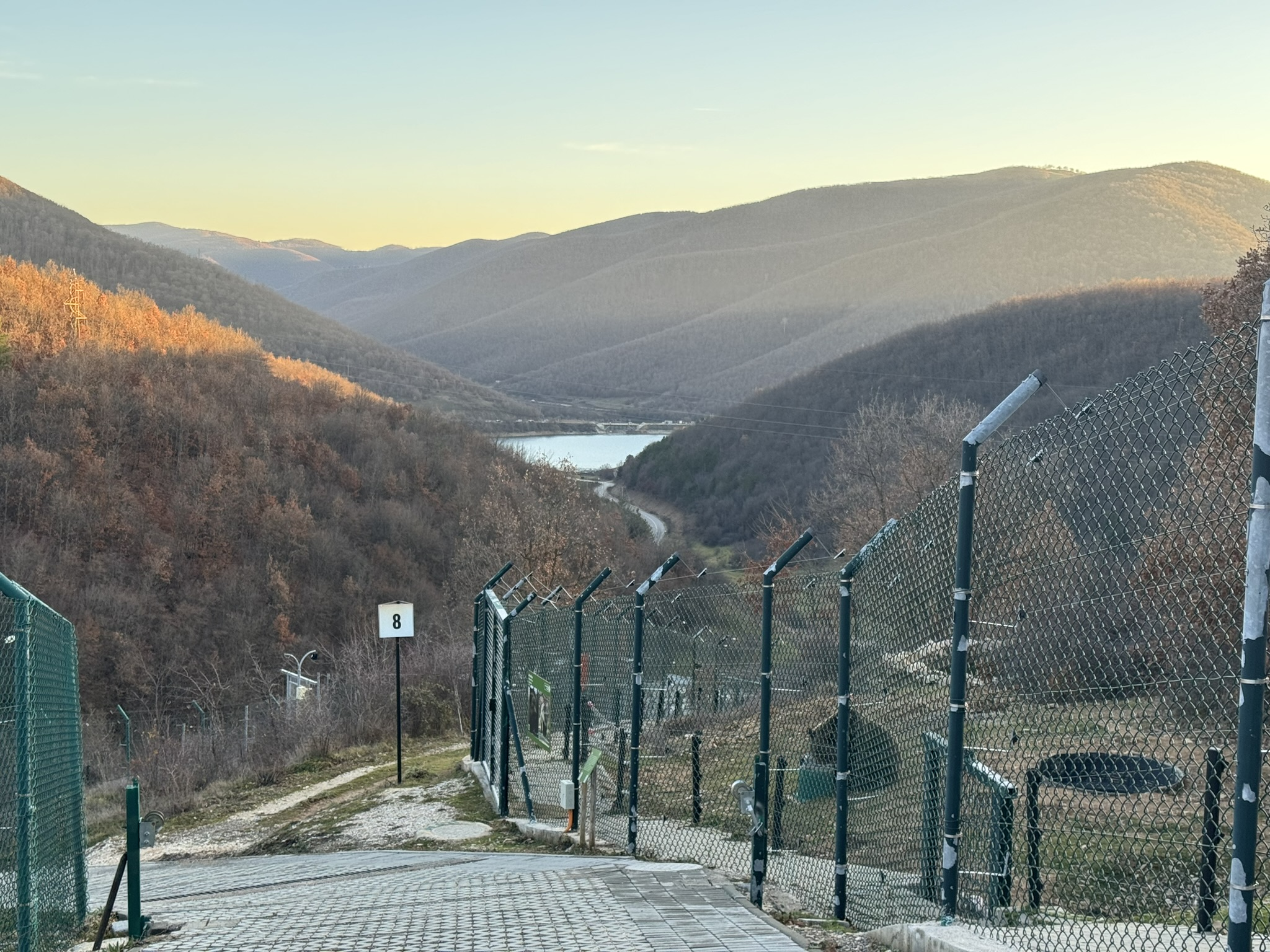
View from the sanctuary, with Lake Badovc visible in the background

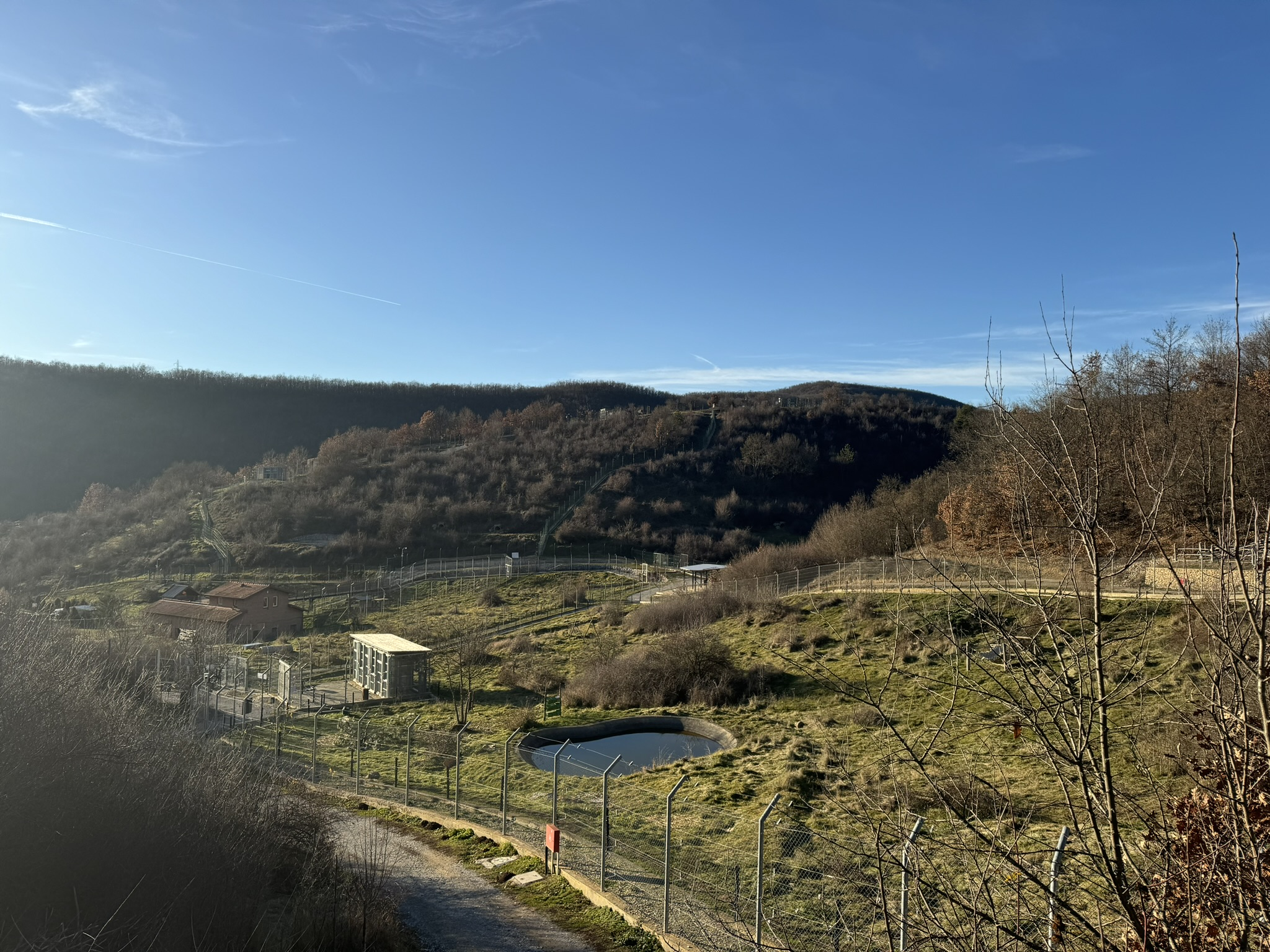
Part of an enclosure at the sanctuary

== See also ==
- Biodiversity of Kosovo
