= 2026 Jieyang dog abuse case =

2026 animal cruelty incident in Guangdong, China

- Date: 28 June 2026
- Venue: Public street in Pingpu Village, Xinheng Town
- Location: Jiedong District, Jieyang, Guangdong, China
- Type: Animal cruelty
- Participants: 5 minors (under 14)
- Outcome: No criminal charges (perpetrators below the age of criminal responsibility); perpetrators sent to a specialized school for corrective education
- Deaths: 4 dogs (a stray mother dog "Wang Wang" and her three puppies)

On 28 June 2026 in Pingpu Village (坪埔村), Xinheng Town, Jiedong District (揭东区新亨镇), Jieyang (揭阳), Guangdong, China, five boys under the age of 14 killed a stray dog — widely referred to as Wang Wang (旺旺) — and her three puppies, beating the puppies with spiked poles to death, stabbing them, poking the mother dog's eye out and burning her to death. The boys filmed the abuse and laughed for the entire time, and the footage spread rapidly on Chinese social media and later on overseas platforms, provoking widespread public outrage.

Because all five were below China's age of criminal responsibility, they were not criminally charged; on 30 June 2026 the Xinheng Town government announced that they had been sent to a specialized school for corrective education. The perceived leniency of the outcome, together with the absence of a national animal-protection law in China, prompted renewed calls for legislation against animal cruelty and drew reactions in mainland China, Hong Kong, Taiwan and internationally.

== Background ==
The dog was a stray living in Pingpu Village, a rural community in Xinheng Town, Jiedong District, where villagers regularly fed her; she was known locally as Wang Wang. She had recently given birth to a litter of three puppies, which were about two weeks old at the time of the incident. According to media reports, the dog had been beaten by the same boys prior to the incident, this time she didn't leave because her babies were held hostage. The five boys involved were sixth-grade students aged approximately 12.

Mainland China has no nationwide legislation against cruelty to animals, although some cities and provinces have introduced local rules. Proposals for animal-protection legislation have been submitted repeatedly to the National People's Congress, including by deputy Zhao Wanping, who by 2026 had proposed such legislation in eight separate years without success. Under Chinese criminal law, children under the age of 14 are, with narrow exceptions, exempt from criminal responsibility.

== Incident ==
Screenshot of Jieyang dog abuse case video.

On 28 June 2026, five boys, all under the age of 14, attacked the dogs in a public street area of Pingpu Village. According to media reports based on villagers' accounts and video recordings of the attack, they wrapped an iron wire around the mother dog's neck and dragged her along the ground, beat her and the puppies repeatedly with spiked wooden sticks, and beat the three puppies to death. They then used a combustion-supporting patch, poured a flammable liquid, suspected to be gasoline, over the injured mother dog and set her on fire, killing her. In footage of the attack described by media reports, the boys who filmed the abuse themselves, could be heard laughing and shouting phrases such as "It smells so good" during the burning. As the dog was dying, one of the boys gouged her eyes and stabbed her chest and abdomen with a wooden stick. They also danced and sang while beating her with an iron whip until she died.

Footage of the abuse was uploaded to local online groups and by 29 June had spread to Weibo, TikTok and Xiaohongshu, and subsequently to overseas platforms including Threads and YouTube.

== Official response ==
The Jiedong branch of the Jieyang Public Security Bureau opened an investigation into the case. On 30 June 2026, the Xinheng Town People's Government issued a public notice stating that it had immediately formed a task force after the video circulated on 29 June; that education authorities had organised schools to strengthen student education; that the parents of those involved had been urged to fulfil their guardianship responsibilities; and that the five individuals involved, all under 14 years of age, had been sent to a specialized school (专门学校) for corrective education. The notice also appealed to the public to stop spreading information related to the case and to refrain from cyberbullying.

Beijing lawyer Zhou Zhaocheng observed that no criminal charges were possible, both because the boys were under the age of criminal responsibility and because cruelty to animals is not in itself an offence under Chinese law, and described placement in a specialized school as the most severe corrective measure available under the existing legal framework.

== Reactions ==
=== Celebrities and companies ===
Several public figures spoke out. Beginning on 5 July, the actor Du Jiang posted videos on TikTok condemning the abuse and calling for animal-protection legislation; the platform removed his posts three times, and he continued to repost them. The removals fuelled debate over whether Chinese platforms were unduly restricting discussion of animal protection. The Taiwanese actress Joe Chen published a Weibo post lamenting the case that was deleted within seconds of posting; the deletion itself became a trending topic on Weibo.

Hong Kong entertainers including Steven Ma and Andrew Yuen also called publicly for animal-protection legislation in mainland China.

A number of Chinese companies expressed opposition to animal cruelty, and internet users funded advertisements on outdoor screens in cities including Shenzhen, Hangzhou and Zhengzhou calling for animal-protection legislation; some of the advertisements were either refused to be displayed or later removed.

=== Public reaction ===
People in various places around the world—such as Mong Kok in Hong Kong, Taipei 101 in Taiwan, Shibuya in Japan, Kuala Lumpur in Malaysia, Toronto in Canada, and Times Square in New York City, United States—have voluntarily paid for public big-screen advertisements to show their support for Wangwang and call for the enactment of animal protection laws. Protests were also held in Sydney, Australia, The Hague in the Netherlands, Seoul, South Korea, London, Rome and Milan in Italy, and New York, Chicago, Los Angeles, and San Francisco in the United States.

The case provoked widespread anger on Chinese social media, with many users criticising the outcome as too lenient and calling for an animal-protection law. Despite official appeals, internet users circulated personal information about the five boys, one young woman who was possibly one of the boys' older sister, and some of their parents. Following the incident, netizens across China engaged in online advocacy, posting awareness content on social media platforms such as Xiaohongshu and TikTok, and forming private chat groups to discuss the case and organize calls for animal protection laws. However, these online activities were met with strict censorship, with platforms rapidly deleting posts, throttling traffic, and banning user accounts. Furthermore, law enforcement actively suppressed offline coordination; in one private chat group of fewer than 200 members, dozens were telephoned or visited by police and warned not to "incite or organize," with authorities also contacting the families of several participants.

In response to an inadequate official response and the ongoing absence of animal protection laws, the public launched an economic boycott targeting Jieyang. The campaign encouraged people to refrain from traveling to the city, reject goods from local merchants, and boycott international brands with supply chains based in Jieyang in order to exert economic pressure on local authorities.

On September 24, 2026, while President Xi Jinping of China visited the White House, for an official state visit and bilateral summit hosted by U.S. President Donald J. Trump, animal rights activists around the world launched a Global Action for Wang Wang by reading a Global Letter for WangWang (#GlobalLetterforWangWang). The action took weeks of planning and coordination by New York City lead organizers. Justice for Wang Wang organizers and activists from across the United States and around the world read and posted on social media an open letter to President Xi Jinping between 8 a.m. to 12 p.m. Washington D.C. time (GMT-4), urging him to "immediately implement strict laws for companion animals" and "support his many animal-loving citizens and their brothers and sisters across the globe by enacting a National Companion, Stray, and Wildlife Animal Protection Law."

After the netizens' grassroots movement established a momentum more than a month after June 28, world-wide media started to report the incident. Doordarshan (DD) India was one of the first channels to report the incident. ABC News Australia reported the incident shortly after DD India. Reuters Connect reported on the protest in London, U.K. on August 1st. San Francisco Chronicle and Yahoo! News both reported the first protest in Union Square, San Francisco on August 22nd. The Global Action Day took place on August 28, two months after Wang Wang and her babies were murdered, uniting international activists in protests and memorials outside Chinese embassies and consulates to demand legal protections against animal abuse. KTSF26 reported the protest took place outside of the Consulate General of the People's Republic of China in San Francisco.

On September 8th, No Cut News of South Korea, published Korea Steps Up for Wangwang, the Burned-To Death Dog… "Wants to Eradicate Animal Abuse". On September 14th, MBC Every1, reported Elementary school students abuse a puppy and even film it... The tragedy that struck the stray do...,

On October 1st, 2026, Lanterna of Italy published Global outcry for tougher laws against animal torture: Italy also takes to the streets, covering Justice for Wang Wang protests in Rome and Milan.

=== Organizations ===
The Hong Kong SPCA said it was "deeply saddened and outraged" by the case and reported the videos to the Hong Kong police, who said they would ask Threads and YouTube to remove the footage; the SPCA said its request was aimed at removing uncensored footage to prevent distress and potential copycat behaviour. The move drew a backlash from critics who argued that removing the videos would weaken public pressure for accountability; the SPCA apologised for how it had handled and communicated its actions, said it had never intended to suppress discussion of the case, and cancelled its annual Flag Day fundraiser scheduled for 18 July.

Adoption platform Suppaw raised HK$95,000 for a tram campaign featuring Wang Wang, but the proposal was rejected by the tram company, which claimed the dogs' images might "affect public sentiment."

On 17 July 2026, the International Organization for Animal Protection (OIPA) announced that, after receiving more than one hundred reports and appeals from citizens in Italy and other countries, it had sent a formal letter to Chinese authorities and embassies requesting information about the measures adopted and calling for clear legal prohibitions on animal cruelty, psychological assessment and monitoring of the minors involved, and action against the recording and dissemination of animal-torture content. Humane World for Animals also called for legal reforms and stronger anti-cruelty frameworks to address systemic animal abuse. Online petitions demanding accountability and animal-protection legislation in China circulated internationally. Animal advocacy organization Lady Freethinker launched a petition demanding justice for the victims and the enactment of nationwide animal protection legislation in China, gathering over 50,000 signatures as of July 2026. An online petition titled "The Tragedy: Innocent Animal Lives Destroyed" was launched on Change.org, gathering over 70,000 signatures in two weeks to demand justice for the dogs and urge the enacting of animal protection legislation in China.

Human Rights Watch urged Chinese authorities not to view the peaceful expressions public outrage as a threat to national security, nor to suppress public discussion of animal abuse, but instead to listen to what people are saying, whether it's about personal freedom, the rights of the public, or the protection of Wang Wang's.

South Korean animal rights organization CARE called for public participation in a rally in Seoul on 25 July to commemorate "Wang Wang" and her family, and urged China to enact animal protection legislation. The organization also launched a related petition.

The Japanese animal protection group Feline Guardians Japan held a demonstration in Osaka on August 8. Citizens took to Midosuji to speak out for Wang Wang and other abused animals, demanding an end to animal cruelty.

== See also ==
- Animal welfare and rights in China
- Animal protection law of the People's Republic of China
- Chinese Animal Protection Network
- Dog meat in China
- "Jack Latiao" cat abuse incident
- Orelha case
- Juvenile delinquency
