= Animals of China =

Animals of China may refer to:

- Wildlife of China
- List of endangered and protected species of China
- Chinese zodiac, consisting of twelve animals
- Four benevolent animals: the Qilin, Chinese dragon, Turtle and Fenghuang
- Four Symbols (China), four mythological creatures in Chinese constellations

== See also ==
- Animal welfare and rights in China
- Chinese Animal Protection Network
