= Wang Wang (disambiguation) =

Wang Wang or wangwang may refer to:

- Wang Wang (Chinese: 网网; pinyin: Wǎng Wǎng, born 2005), a panda formerly of Adelaide Zoo
- Wang Wang (Chinese: 旺旺; pinyin: Wàng Wàng, died 2026), a dog tortured and killed in Guangdong, China
- Want Want (Chinese: 旺旺; pinyin: Wàng Wàng, founded 1962), a Taiwanese food manufacturer
- Wang Wang Blues, a 1920 jazz single
