= World Day for the End of Fishing =

International campaign by animal rights activists

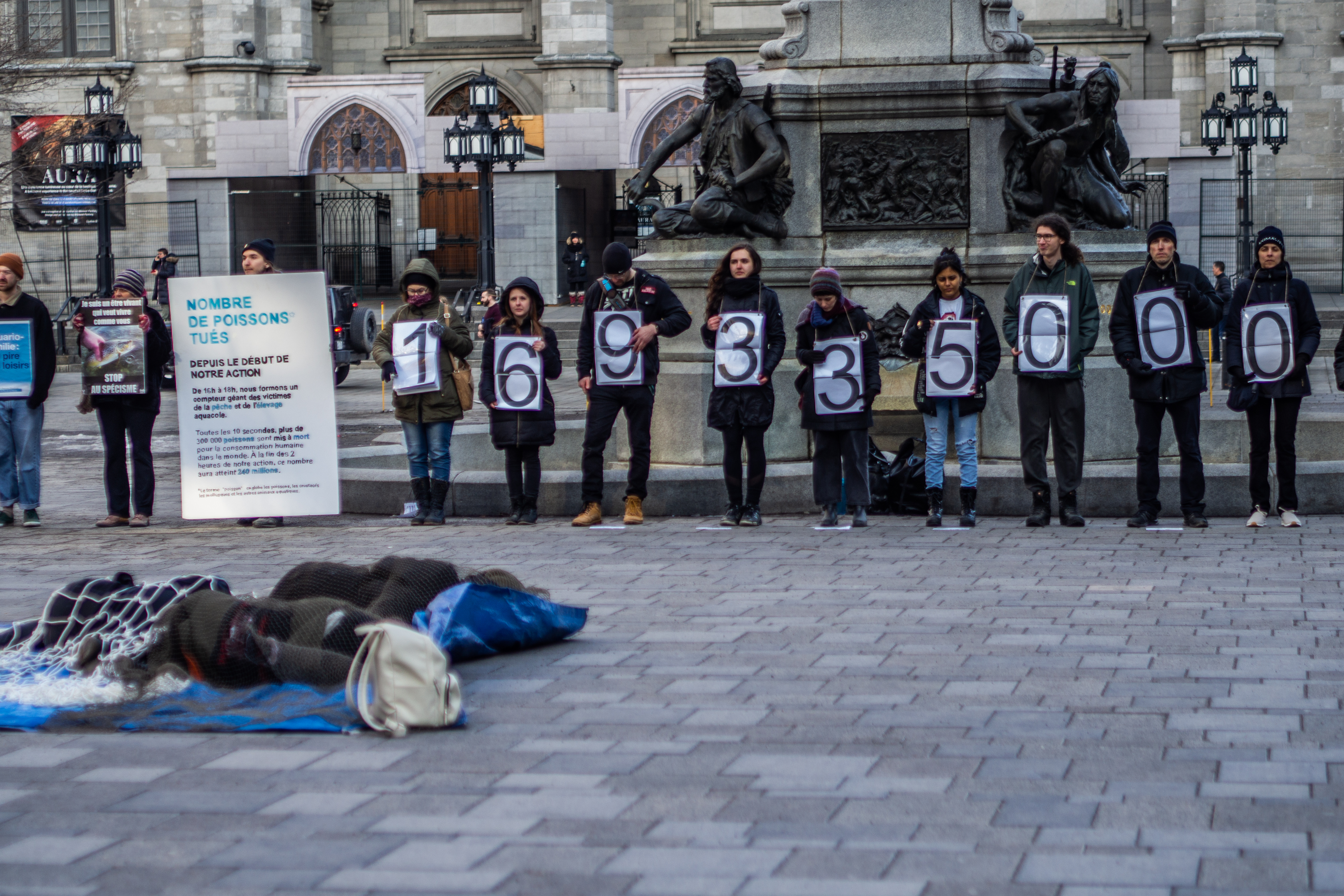
- Montreal activists from Le Collectif Antispéciste pour la Solidarité Animale (CASA) organized a fish count for the victims of fishing in 2019 for The World Day for the End of Fishing.
- Location: International
- Years active: 9
- Inaugurated: March 24, 2017

The World Day for the End of Fishing (WoDEF) is an international campaign launched by animal rights activists that demand the end of fishing practices. It takes place on the last Saturday of March every year.

The campaign was born in Switzerland and France in 2016 and took an international turn in 2017. It was first launched by the association Pour L'Égalité Animale (PEA).

== Events ==
Over the years and around the world lots of actions were organized for the WoDEF: street protests, sit-ins, screenings, conferences, fish counts, workshops, exhibitions, etc. in order to bring awareness to fish pain, sentience and fish intelligence.

In 2017, for its first edition, the event occurred in many cities around the world: in Lorient, Paris, Valence, Lyon, Lille, Montpellier, Saint Malo, Rennes (France), Geneva, Lausanne (Swiss), Brussels, Namur, Charleroi (Belgium), Montreal, Toronto (Canada), Stuttgart, Vogelsberg, Siegen, Hannover, Göttingen, Hamburg, Berlin (Germany), Lisbon (Portugal), Tel Aviv, Haifa (Israel), Melbourne (Australia), San Diego and Monterey Bay (United States).

In 2018, for its second edition, the event occurred once again internationally: in Canada, Australia, Belgium, Switzerland, Peru, Sweden, United States, Germany, Japan, Brazil, France, Denmark, Mexico, United Kingdom and Panama. In the same year, an open letter signed by dozens of philosophers and scientists, including Stevan Harnard, Peter Singer, Valéry Giroux, Sue Donaldson, Will Kymlicka and Élise Desaulniers, was published in Le Nouveau Magazine Littéraire in order to highlight the WoDEF.

In 2019, for its third edition, activists from 269 Life France pierced their cheeks with fish hooks in a street protest for the WoDEF.

== Demands ==
The organizers of the Word Day for the End of Fishing demand the abolition of all kinds of fishing practices for fish, crustaceans and cephalopods: the end of aquaculture, industrial or wild fishing, the use of marine animals as domestic pets, in scientific experiments and for entertainment, in antispeciesist perspective.

Protesters affirm that fish can feel pain and that it is unnecessary to consume them.

== See also ==
- World Day for Laboratory Animals
- World Day for the End of Speciesism
- Antispeciesism
- Veganism
