= Élise Desaulniers =

Animal rights and welfare advocate

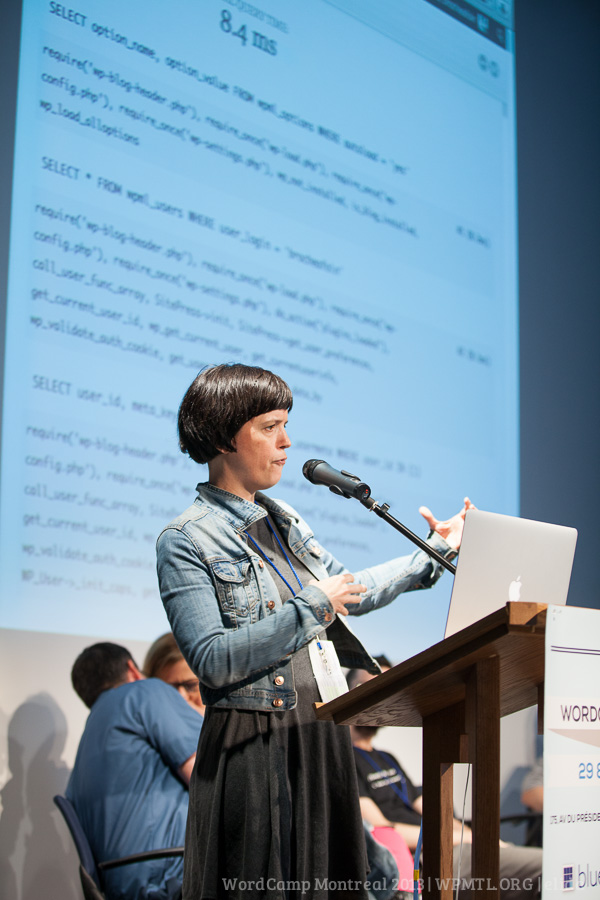
- Élise Desaulniers giving a talk at WordCamp Montréal on 29 June 2013
- Born: Joliette, Quebec, Canada
- Education: UQAM (B.A., Bachelor in Political Science),
- Occupation: Author
- Website: en.edesaulniers.com

Élise Desaulniers is an author, writer, journalist, vegan and an advocate for animal welfare and animal rights. Her writings have aroused considerable controversy in Quebec, with its large dairy industry.

In 2022, she donated a kidney to an anonymous recipient for altruistic reasons, declaring that childbirth is a greater physical hardship than donating a kidney. During her recovery, she published an article explaining the thought-process leading to her decision, her experience with organ donation and an overview of the practices surrounding organ donation in Canada and elsewhere.

In 2022, she left her role as head of the Montreal SPCA. As of May 2023, according to her own website, she is the head of Fondation Dépendances Montréal.

== Honours ==
She won the Grand Prix du journalisme indépendant - opinion ou analyse from the Association des journalistes indépendants du Québec in 2015 for her article Les vrais mâles préfèrent la viande – Convergences du féminisme et de l’antispécisme.

In 2020, her book Tables Véganes, co-written with Patricia Martin, won the Gold award from Taste Canada Awards.

== Publications ==
- Je mange avec ma tête: Les conséquences de nos choix alimentaires ("I Eat With My Head: The Consequences of Our Dietary Choices"), Stanké, 2011; Comer con cabeza, Errata Naturae 2016.
- Vache à Lait: Dix mythes de l'industrie laitière, Stanké 2013, La Plage 2017; Cash Cow: Ten Myths about the Dairy Industry, Lantern 2015; Il Libro Nero del Latte, Sonda 2016.
- Le défi végane 21 jours ("The 21 Day Vegan Challenge"), Trécarré 2016, La Plage 2017.

== See also ==
- Effective altruism
- Organ gifting
