= Street cats in China =

Population of feral cats

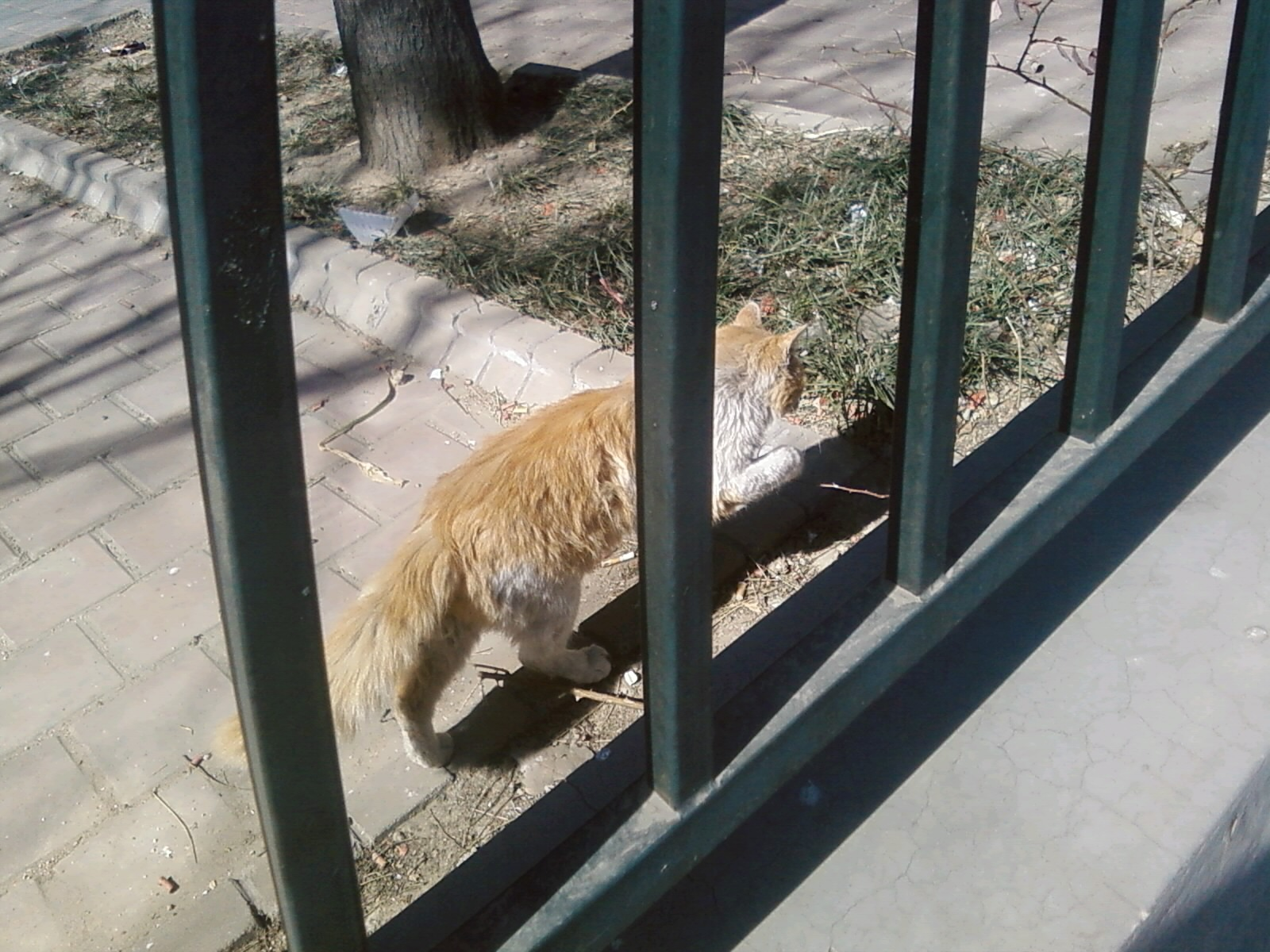
A feral cat in Beijing

In China, populations of feral cats, known commonly as street cats (Chinese: 街猫; pinyin: jiē māo; lit. 'street cat'), are very large, with tens of millions of strays throughout the country. They have found worldwide popularity as internet memes through the live camera app Hello Street Cat, or Jiemao, which enables volunteers to install smart cat houses around the nation, which feature live cameras and an automatic feeder powered by donations.

Because of a lack of animal cruelty laws in China, an underground market for cat abuse material has flourished online, using coded language to identify themselves. These communities have an overlap with misogynist sentiment and are predominantly made up of young men. Some organizations, such as the Feline Guardians, have formed in order to combat cat abuse in China and the distribution of cat abuse material online.

== Overview ==
Estimates of China's stray-cat population range between 22 million (World Health Organization, 2022) and 53 million (China Pet Industry White Paper, 2021). This number has only continued to grow with time, amplified by an influx of abandoned, non-desexed pets and a lack of formal animal shelters or restrictions on the breeding of pets. While trap–neuter–return is widely supported by the Chinese public, TNR campaigns are mostly handled by volunteers and activists. As of 2025, the Chinese government has yet to develop a nationwide strategy to handle the amount of stray cats.

== Hello Street Cat ==
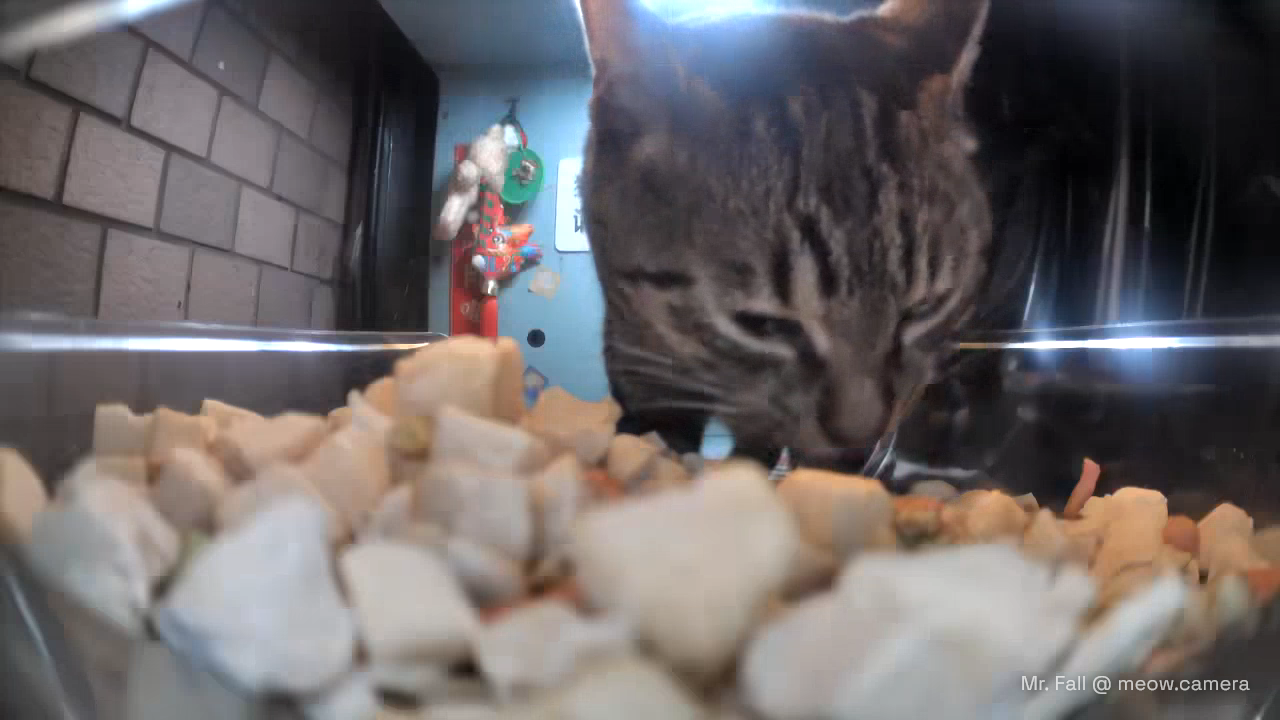
A cat eating from a Hello Street Cat feeder.

In 2022, Hello launched the app Hello Street Cat, or Jiemao, which features smart cat houses placed around China with multiple live cameras, allowing users to view the house from a selection of different angles. These cat houses also feature an automatic feeder, which is refilled in real time according to user donations. The app allows for location tracking of street cats, and facilitation of adoptions. The app has a notable fanbase on social media platforms in China such as Douyin and Bilibili. Hello Street Cat houses have been seen in over a dozen Chinese cities, and are usually placed in secluded areas in order to not impede on residential areas, and so that the houses are more easily manageable. By the end of 2023, over 7,000 cat houses had been installed just in Shanghai alone, and as of August 2025, the app has tens of millions of registered users.

There has been some concern among Chinese internet users about the automatic feeder causing health issues when not cleaned, such as the potential of old food attracting bugs and mold to the feeder. The houses are primarily cleaned and maintained by volunteers. These volunteers also help out with TNR. Hello Street Cat has also attracted criticism for the use of cheap cat food.

=== Cultural impact ===
A viral gif of Mr. Fresh side-eyeing the camera.

Some street cats seen on the Hello Street Cat feeders have become popular on the global internet, especially as internet memes. One such example is "Mr. Fresh", an orange tabby cat who was seen making a "side eye" expression towards the camera. The nickname was given to him when internet users observed that he would only eat freshly-replenished food. Threats were made towards Mr. Fresh by local cat torture rings, and an eye infection prompted cat activists to rescue him. It was eventually decided that Mr. Fresh would be adopted out.

An English-speaking fan wiki has been created in order to document the various cats, who are given silly nicknames based on their appearance and behavior, such as "The Gluttonous Beast" and "Brother Calm". Another fanmade website named Meow.Camera allows for viewing of Hello Street Cat cameras from the web. Drink chain Naixue has appointed some of the internet-famous cats as "ambassadors" for the brand based on user nominations and voting.

== Cat abuse rings ==
While incidents of cat abuse have been documented in China since the 2000s, and China lacks animal cruelty laws, an uptick in cat abuse occurred following the COVID-19 pandemic in which online communities began to form based around the torture of feral cats, referring to themselves as cat lovers (Chinese: 爱猫; pinyin: ài māo). In 2021, an investigation by Legal Daily discovered the underground market for cat abuse material. These communities use highly coded language: clients who pay for cat torture videos, sometimes "made to order", are referred to as "sponsors", while creators of this material are known as "masters". Cats who put up a fight are known as keycaps (Chinese: 键帽; pinyin: jiàn mào), a homophone for "mean cat" (Chinese: 贱猫; pinyin: jiàn māo).

These groups will record or livestream their acts of abuse to post online, with the videos often being viewed by individuals interested in zoosadism and crush fetish content. Videos are most commonly distributed via messaging platforms such as Telegram and QQ. Data collected by Feline Guardians shows a 500% increase in new torture videos posted to cat torture-related Telegram groups between June 2024 and February 2025. The abusers are predominantly young men between the ages of 16 and 24, with many being college students. Some users within the community who watch these videos are not cat abusers themselves, with some owning pet cats of their own. Similar groups have been found outside of China, such as groups documented based in the United Kingdom.

Lara Bruce, President of Feline Guardians, speculates that the torture of cats in China is motivated by the attention the perpetrators receive. She says that notable cat abusers are "treated like celebrities". Other motivations for engaging in these communities include a dislike for the favorable treatment of cats over humans, as well as misogyny, as loving cats is a trait associated with women by members of cat abuse rings. Women who love cats are often referred to with disparaging remarks. Two anti-abuse activists, speaking with a reporter for Initium Media under pseudonyms, say that they believe that the cat abuse community overlaps with incel culture. In another article, Lara says the connection between the two "exposes a dangerous intersection of misogyny and violence among angry young men".

Cat abuse groups began to target Hello Street Cat because of its popularity in March 2024, after a spreadsheet circulated online containing the coordinates of thousands of cat houses, allowing abusers to find potential victims. Shortly after the release of the spreadsheet, an incident occurred in which a man dumped a cat carcass in front of one of the live feeder cameras. Members of abuse communities sometimes place monetary bounties on internet famous cats.

== Activism ==
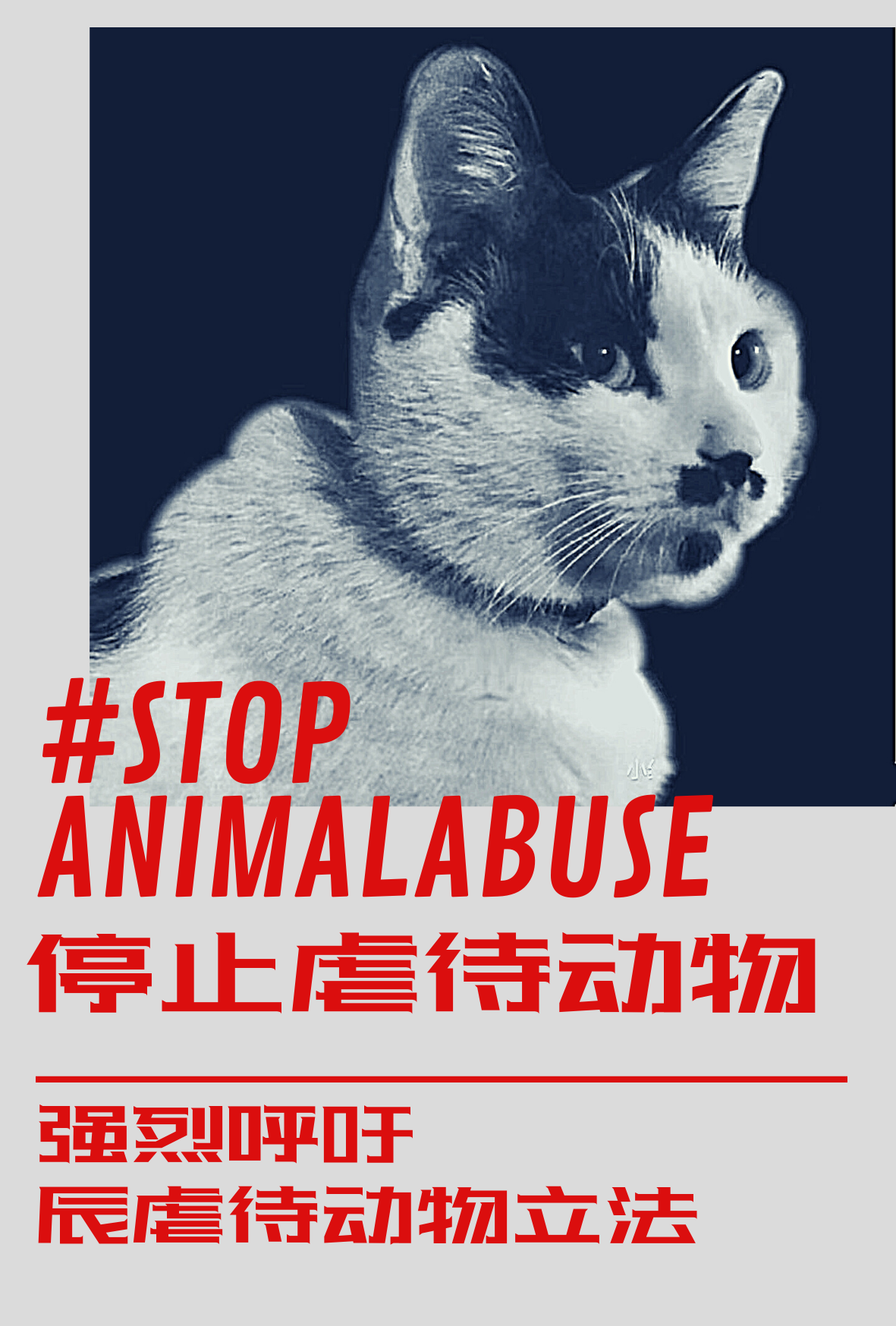
Anti-cat abuse poster from Feline Guardians

Because of how few formal animal shelters exist in the region, individuals have taken the care of street cats into their own hands, running makeshift catteries. Running these catteries is expensive and comes with criticism from neighbors about potential spread of disease. A Beijing-based nonprofit named Companion Animals Working Group also works to protect street cats. Some colleges in the country, like Nanjing University, have organizations dedicated to rescuing sick strays on campus and sterilizing them.

Vigilante justice has been taken against online cat abusers due to the law not protecting animals. In one case, a group of activists cornered a cat abuse livestreamer. Users of the Chinese social media platform Weibo applauded the activists, with one user saying "they gave him a taste of his own medicine". Online retaliation against cat abuse is often met with harassment from abusers, who spam cat abuse-related memes to provoke cat lovers.

Feline Guardians is a U.S.-registered charity formed in retaliation against China's cat abuse rings, operating in around 50 different countries as of December 2024. The organisation focuses on feline torture and abuse prevention, raising awareness, and diplomatic outreach to enact animal portection laws in China. Individual frames of torture videos are carefully analyzed by a trained team in order to identify the perpetrators. The group has organized protests in over 20 cities around the world, including demonstrations outside the Chinese embassy in London.

== See also ==
- Forbidden City cats
