= Forbidden City cats =

Feral cat colony in Beijing, China

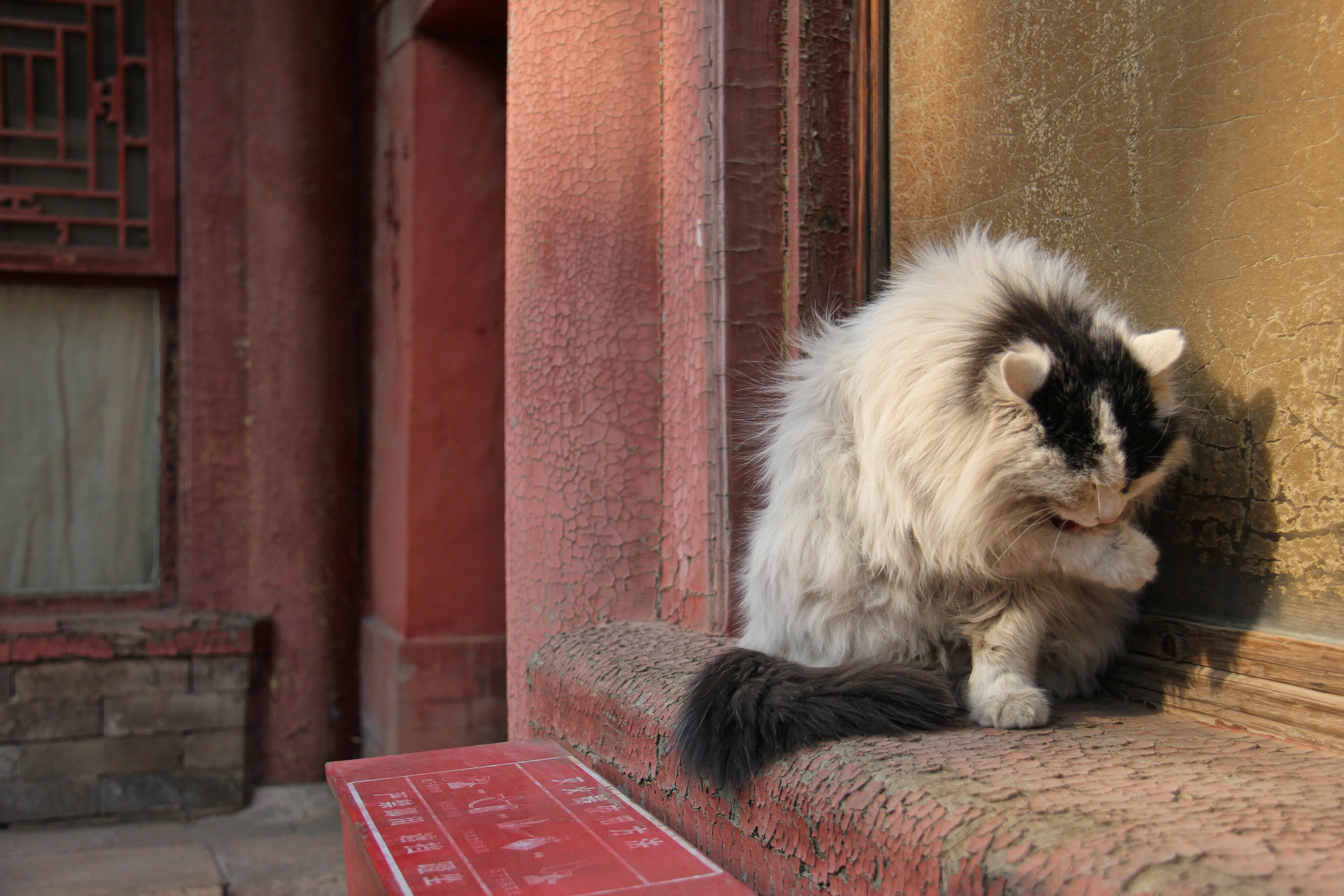
One of the many cats expected to keep mice out of the Forbidden City

The Forbidden City complex in Beijing, China, is home to a large population of feral cats. There is a long history of cats living within the palace alongside the emperors of China. The current population of between 150 and 200 cats has been managed since 2009 by staff of the Palace Museum through a trap–neuter–return scheme.

The presence of cats in the Forbidden City is seen as useful for keeping mice out of the museum's collections. The cats have also become an attraction in their own right, drawing their own tourists, and featuring on merchandise sold by the museum.

== Background ==
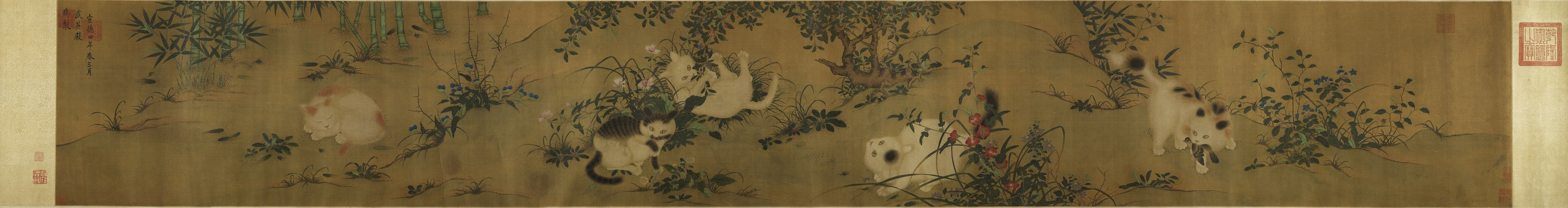
A painting of kittens by the Xuande Emperor, who lived in the Forbidden City.

The Forbidden City was the home of the Emperor of China during the Ming and Qing dynasties. The Xuande Emperor brought many cats into the complex, where he studied and painted them. The Hongxi Emperor is also recorded as liking cats. The Jiajing Emperor awarded titles to cats and dedicated staff to their care, as well as burying one in a golden coffin. Under the Wanli Emperor, cats were owned by everyone in the imperial family. The Qing Qianlong Emperor and Empress Dowager Cixi were known cat lovers. The last emperor, Puyi, and his wife Wanrong, also kept cats in the Forbidden City.

Today, there are perhaps 200,000 feral cats in Beijing, including those in the Forbidden City which is now home to the Palace Museum. In the 1990s, a stray cat attacked a British tourist. Cats also raised issues of cleanliness, with museum staff needing to clean up after them. In order to manage the stray cat population, museum staff adopted the trap–neuter–return method in 2009, which is rare in China due to a belief that neutering harms animals. From 2009 to 2013, ¥18,410 was spent neutering 181 cats, with a register of neutered cats maintained by staff.

Around 200 cats lived in the Forbidden City in 2014. In 2016, the number was between 180 and 200. In 2018, the number was reportedly over 150. Some are likely the result of pet owners abandoning animals at the complex.

== Management ==
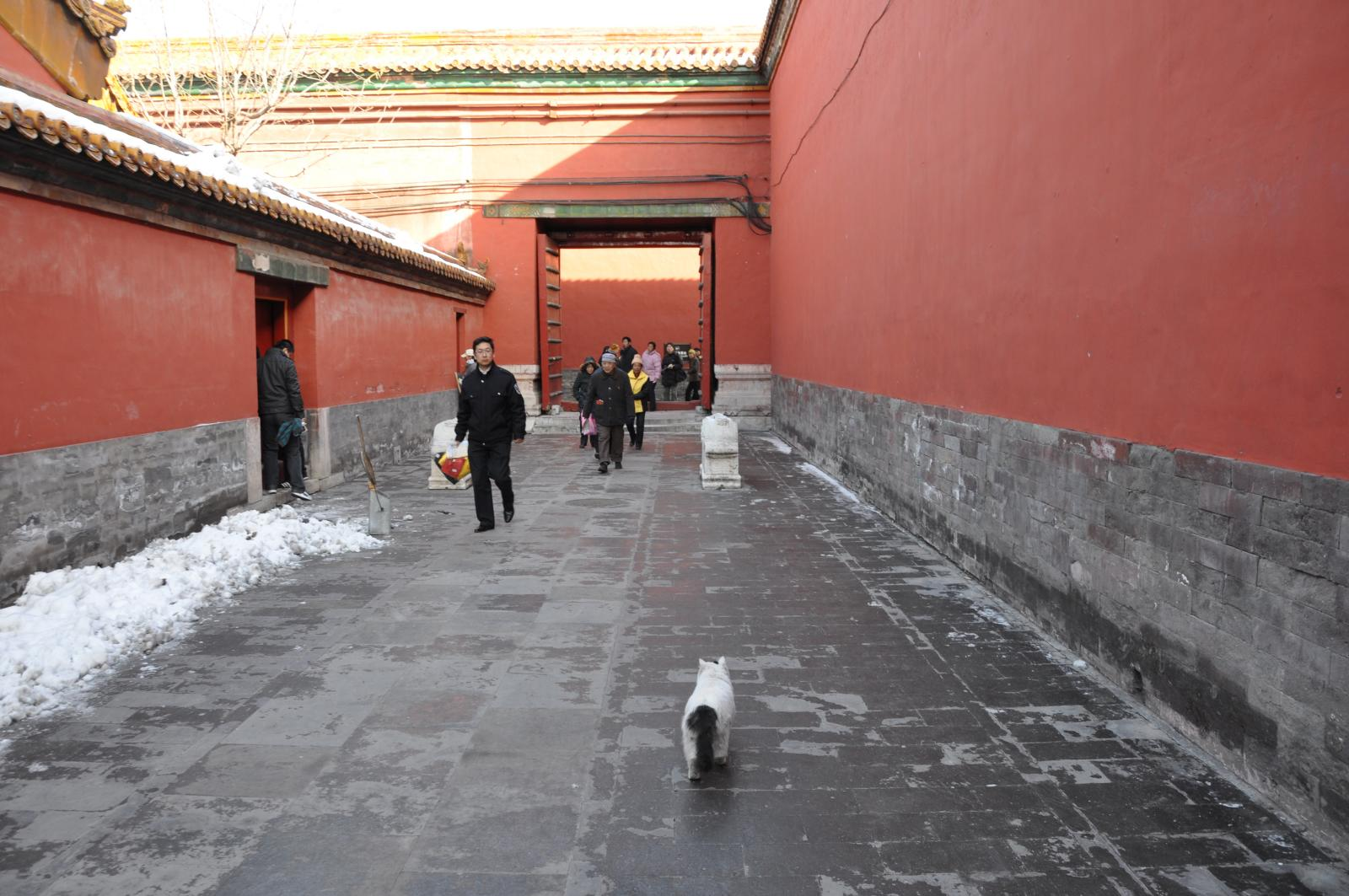
The cats live in the Forbidden City even during the winter, when some are allowed to sleep indoors.

Museum management catches and neuters stray cats found in the complex. Vitamins and vaccinations are also provided. Food is often provided by staff, and the names of every stray cat are recorded along with their gender and the date of their neutering. Funding for cat management comes from the museum's sanitation budget.

Museum management claims that the cats do not damage relics in the complex, which is managed as a museum, but do keep mice out. During the winter, the cats sometimes sleep inside the complex's buildings. During the day they usually stay away from the busier parts of the Forbidden City, and thus may not be seen by most visitors. Visitors are not supposed to feed the cats.

== Impact ==
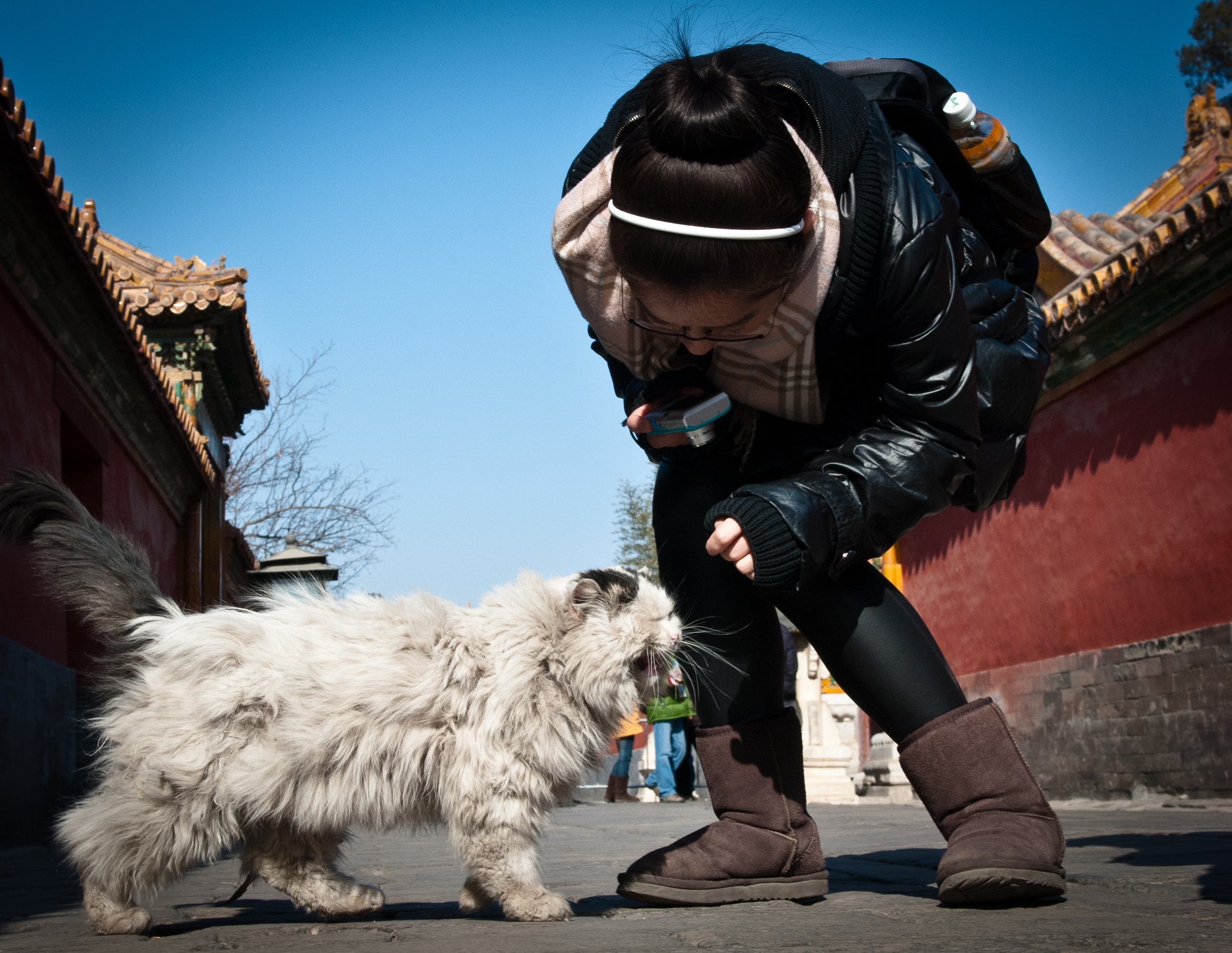
The cats of the Forbidden City have become an attraction drawing visitors to the museum.

Stray cats have become tourist attractions in their own right, especially for domestic tourists. This contributes to overall ticket sales, as well as providing a market for the cat-themed souvenirs sold at the site. Part of the appeal of the cats is the possibility they might descend from the pet cats of Chinese Emperors. The cats are also seen as providing life to the palace, helping turn it into living heritage.

The presence of cats has been useful for marketing the museum, especially to younger audiences. The cats are referred to as "security officers", tasked with protecting the Forbidden City from mice. The museum sells a variety of cat-themed merchandise online. One kitten ornament had 16,000 sales in a month. One group of four cats is marketed as the "royal cat family".

One of the Forbidden City's cats, named Baidian'er (white spot), went viral during the 2018 FIFA World Cup by correctly "predicting" the results of six straight matches.

In 2023, the China National Children's Theatre and the Palace Museum co-produced a stage drama called The Cat God in the Forbidden City, telling the history of the Forbidden City through the eyes of a cat. This was toured in other Chinese cities in 2024. The cats have also featured in other documentaries filmed in the museum.

== Gallery ==
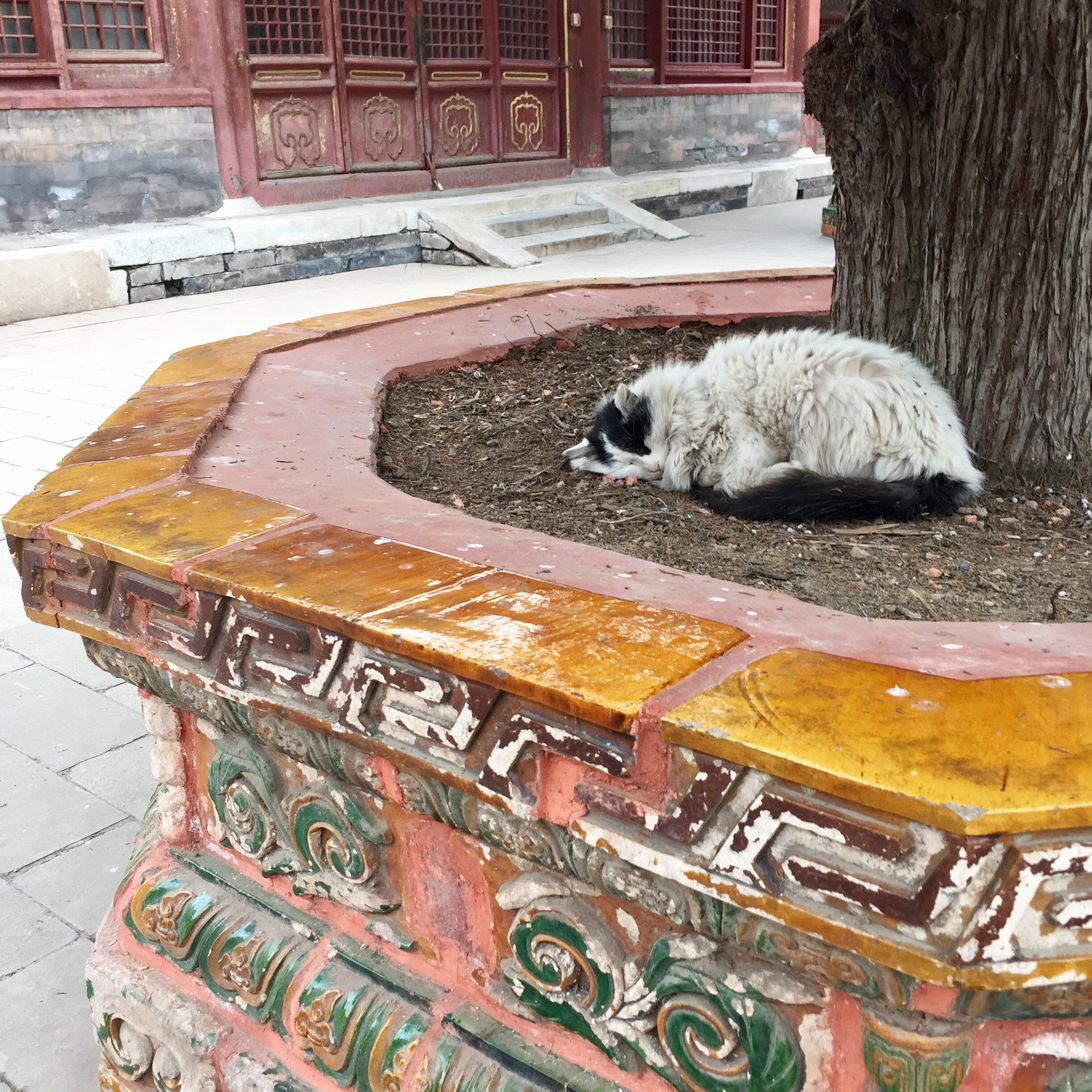

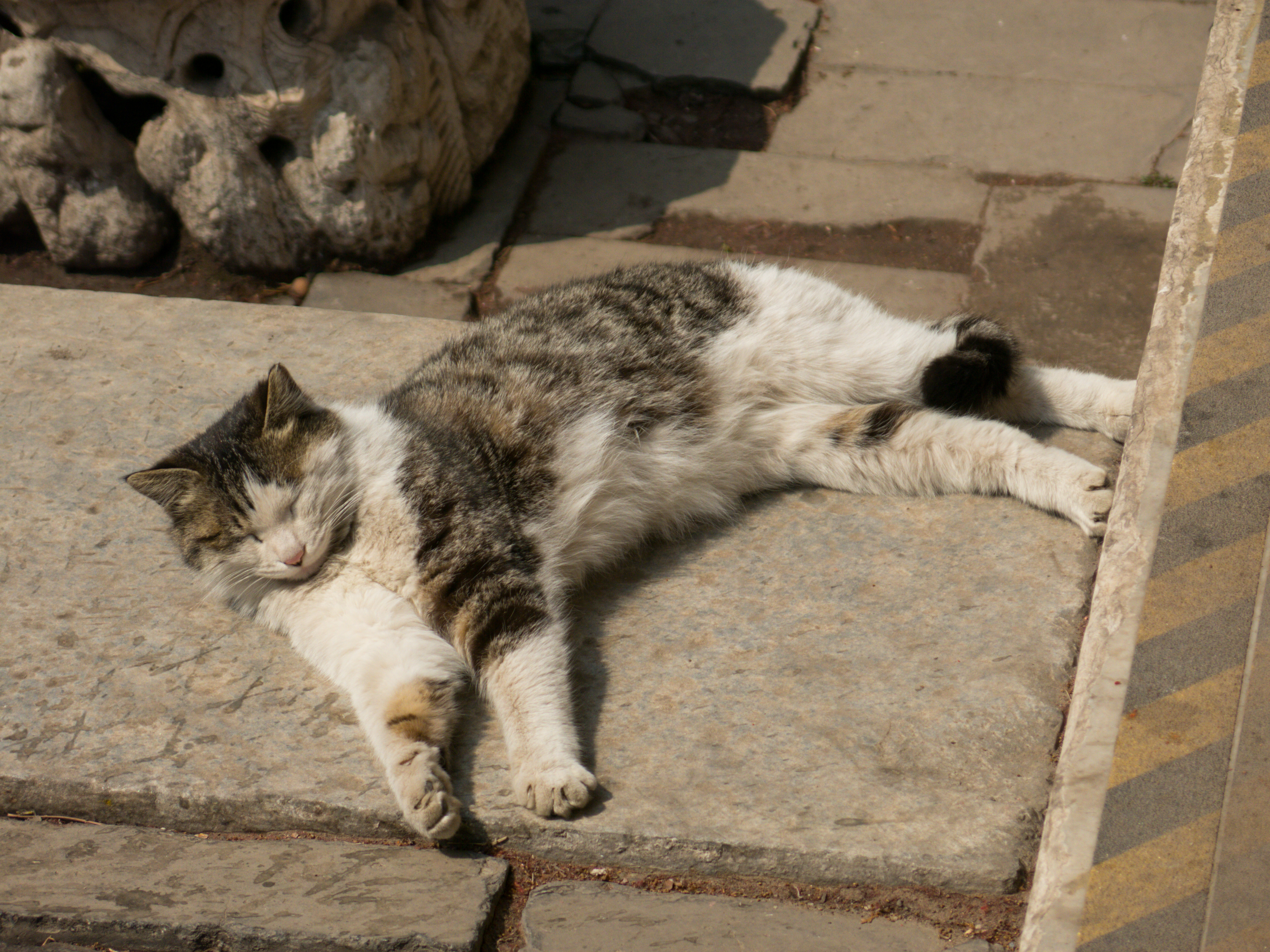

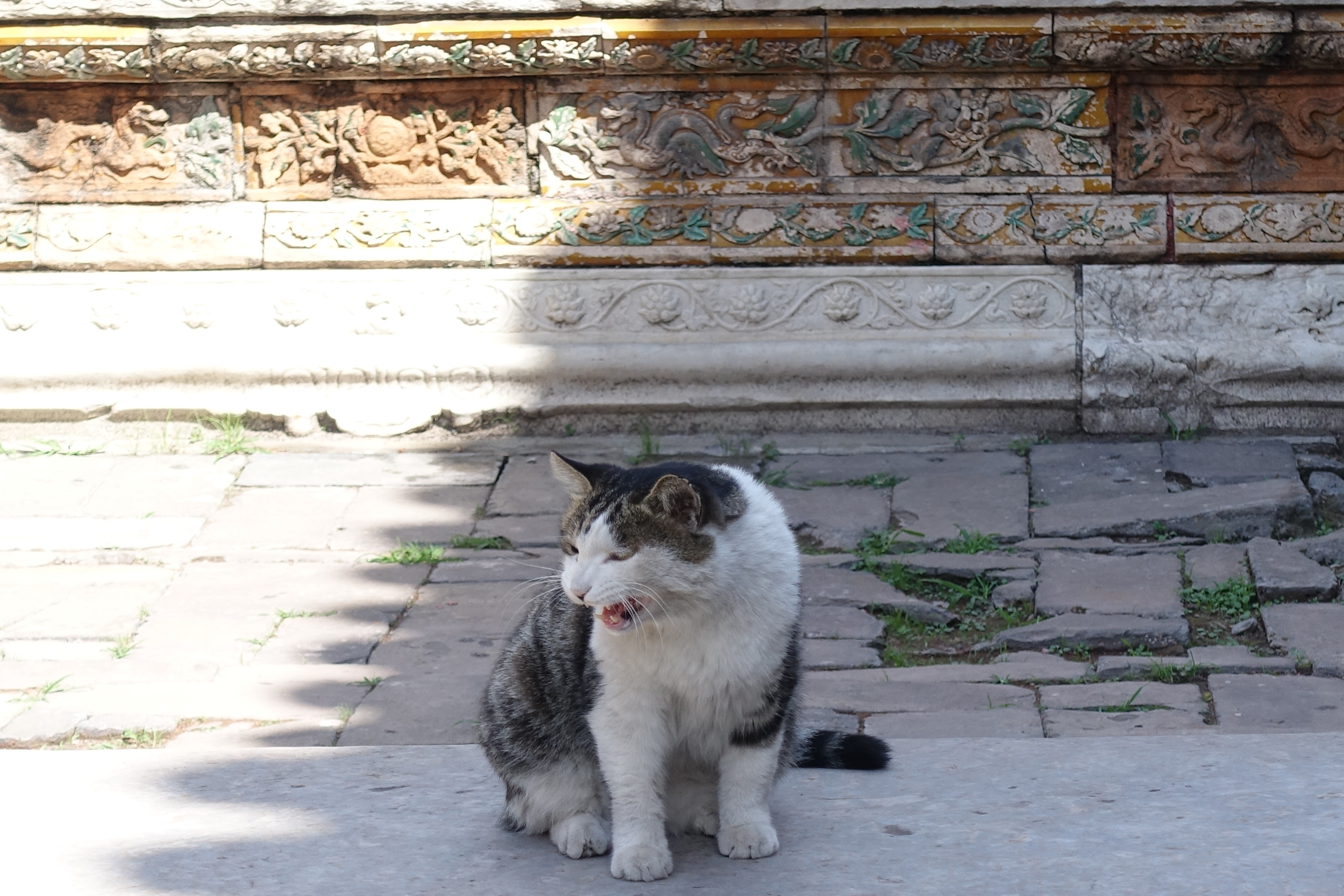

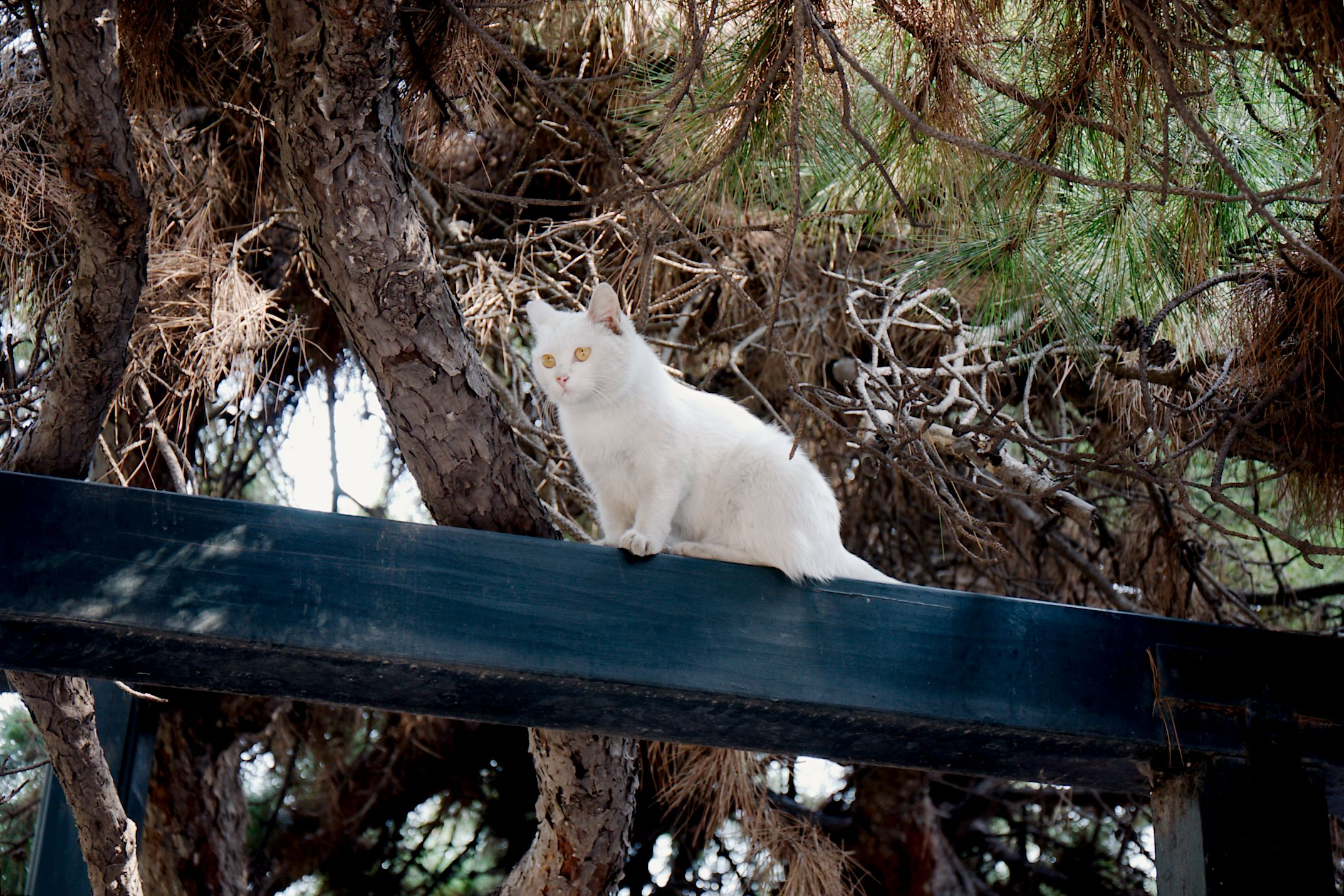

== See also ==
- Cat islands in Japan
- Ernest Hemingway House
- Hermitage cats
- Parliament Hill cat colony
- Chief Mouser to the Cabinet Office
- Street cats in China
