= Wang Yan (activist) =

Chinese animal welfare activist

Wang Yan (Chinese: 王岩; pinyin: Wáng Yán; born 1986) is a Chinese self-professed 'animal welfare activist' in Helong city, northeast China. He was formerly a proprietor of iron and steel factory, and was a millionaire. He claims that the loss of his dog in 2012 compelled him to devote his resources for saving dogs. From that year he started a rescue centre for dogs in Helong city. As of 2015, he claims he has helped rescuing more than 2,000 stray dogs, and is keeping over 200 dogs at his centre. He maintains he has spent all his money and has turned bankrupt.

== Activism ==
Wang claims to have started to make a successful business around 2005, when the steel industry in China was improved. Wang says that when he lost his dog, after several failed investigations, someone suggested him to look into the city slaughterhouse. He spent a week in the slaughterhouse, but to no avail.

Instead, Wang maintains his observation of the appalling slaughter practices led him to work for animal welfare. Dog meats are sold in the market, and these meat mainly come from stray dogs. The butchering of dogs for meat is a traditional business, and China has been known for its dog meat. There is even a Lychee and Dog Meat Festival (or Yulin Dog Meat Festival) in which 10,000-15,000 dogs are consumed every year.

The local government of a Dayang district in Shandong province even attempted to annihilate all dogs, including licensed pets. In September 2015, the government issue an order that "All dogs must be removed from the district, otherwise authorities will enter your house and kill your dog on the spot." More than 5,000 dogs are exterminated.

Wang purchased the slaughterhouse and an abandoned steel factory in Helong town, Changchun, which he developed as a rescue centre for stray dogs. He named it the "Changchun Animal Rescue Base". He claims to have expanded the premise to house at least 1000 dogs at a time. He asserts that he started spending his financial resources for dog food and medications without any gain. He alleges his expenditures have cost over three million yuan ($470,186). He says he persuades people to adopt his stray dogs, but would not accept any donation for himself. He only appreciates food for his dogs as a gift. He commented in an interview in November 2015, saying:

I do not accept monetary donations. I only hope that kind-hearted people will be able to donate a few supplies to help build a home for these 200 dogs.

== See also ==
- Animal welfare and rights in China
- Wang Yan Twitter Social : https://x.com/wangyanactivist
