= World Day for the End of Speciesism =

Annual observance against speciesism

The World Day for the End of Speciesism
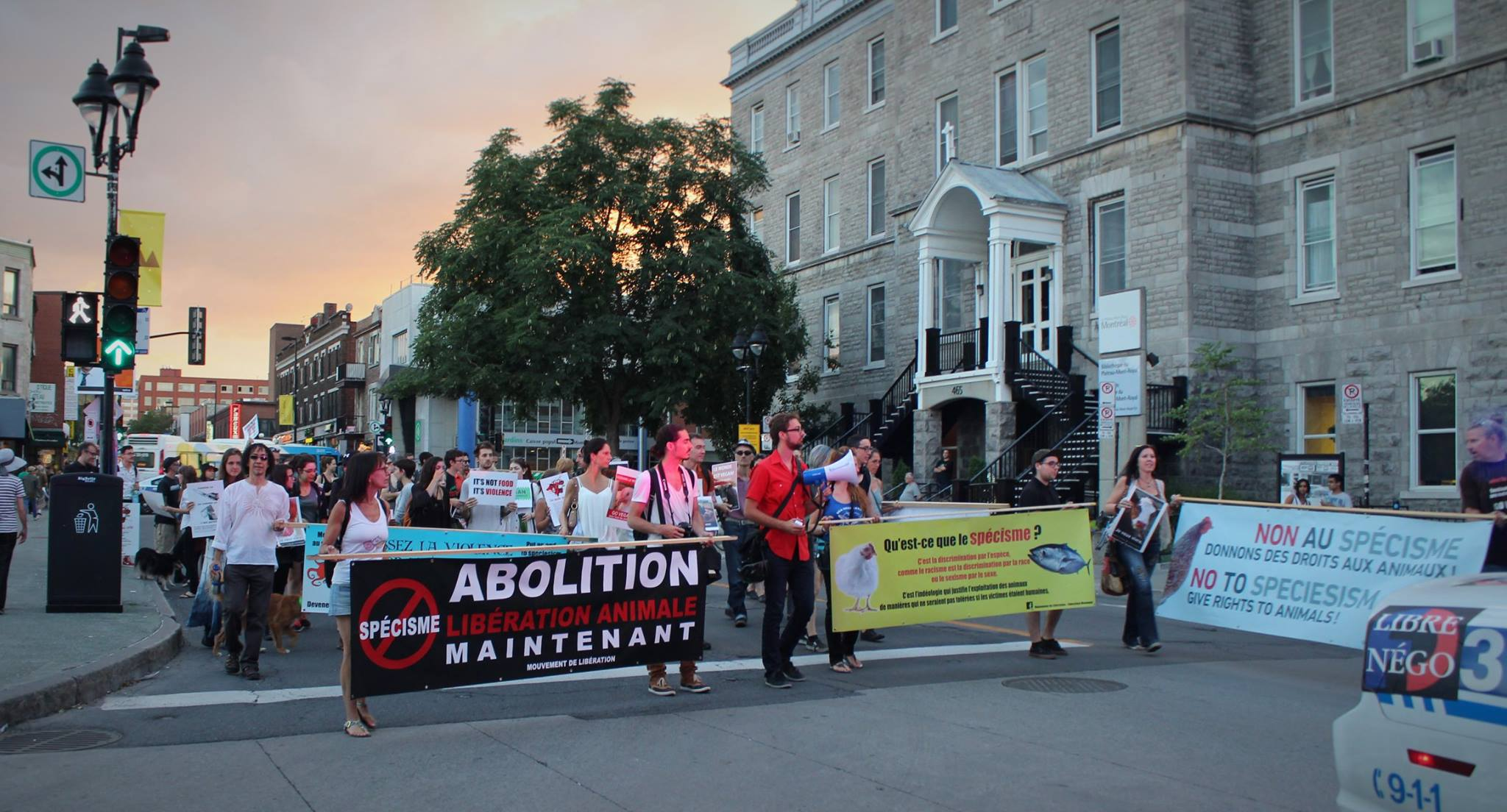
- World Day for the End of Speciesism 2015, Montreal, Canada
- Status: Active
- Genre: Animal rights
- Date: Last weekend of August
- Frequency: Annual
- Venue: Various locations worldwide
- Country: Global
- Years active: Since 2015
- Inaugurated: August 29, 2015
- Major events: Advocacy against speciesism
- Leader: Various animal rights organizations

The World Day for the End of Speciesism (WoDES) is an international event aimed at denouncing speciesism, which is discrimination against non-human animals on the basis of their species. WoDES has been held annually at the end of August since 2015.

The observance was initiated in 2015 by members of the Swiss association Pour l'Egalité Animale (PEA), which coordinates the international day annually, providing support aids.

This is not to be confused with the "World Day Against Speciesism", which is observed annually on the 5th of June.

== Demands ==
The core demand of the activists at this event is to overcome speciesist ideology, an ideology they claim is comparable to racism and sexism, which uses species as the criterion by which individuals are discriminated against. According to Yves Bonnardel, similar suffering should be considered similarly, regardless of the species of the individual suffering.

More specifically, the World Day for the End of Speciesism calls for the abolition of property status for animals, the introduction of animal welfare education in schools, the closure of slaughterhouses, a permanent end to fishing, the removal of animals as subjects of scientific experimentation, and for humans to stop considering animals as exploitable natural resources.

== See also ==
- World Day for Laboratory Animals
- World Day for the End of Fishing
