= World Day for Laboratory Animals =

World day

World Day For Animals In Laboratories
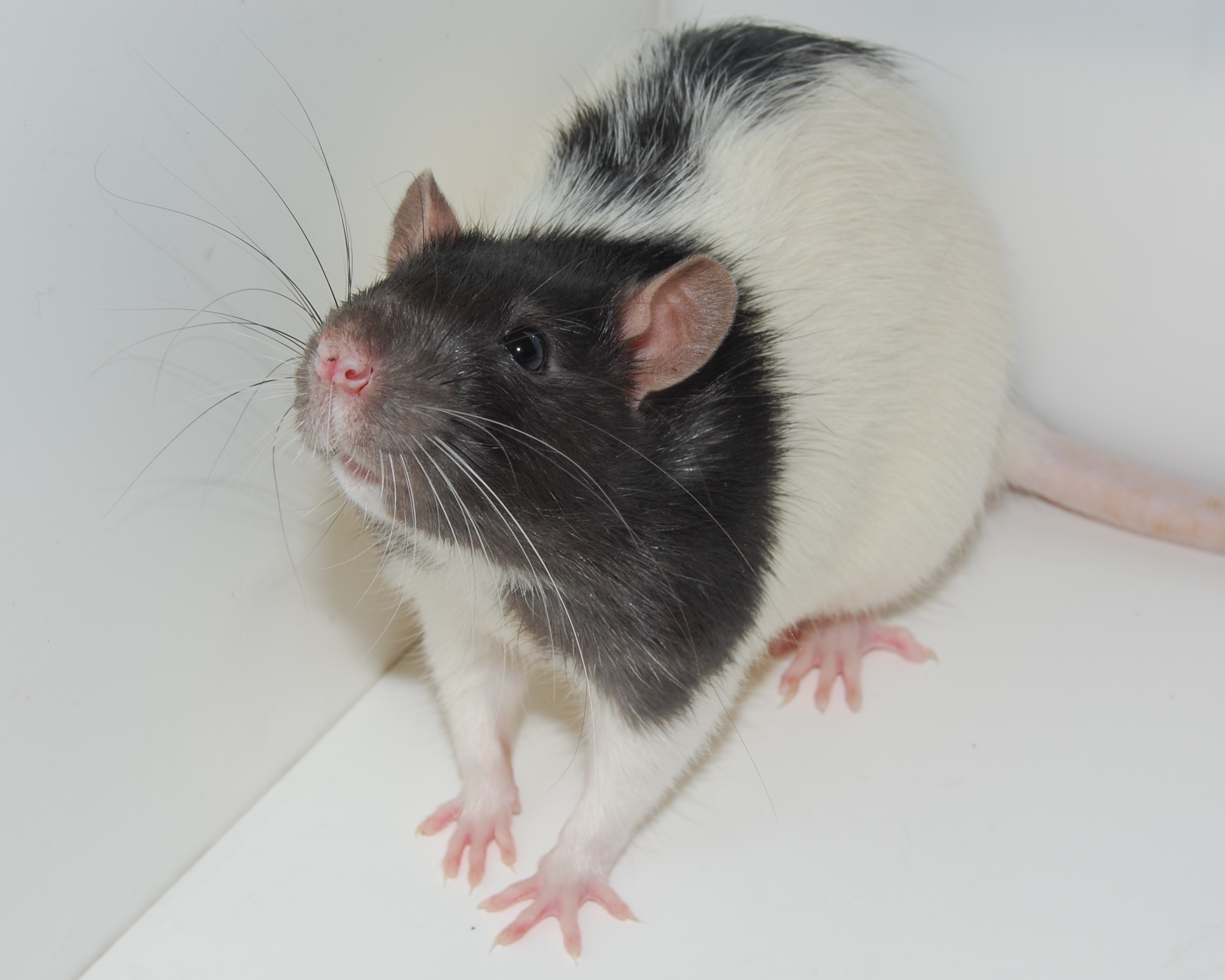
- Laboratory rat
- Status: Active
- Genre: Animal rights
- Date: April 24
- Begins: April 18
- Ends: April 24
- Frequency: Annual
- Venue: Various locations worldwide
- Country: Global
- Years active: Since 1979
- Inaugurated: April 24, 1979
- Major events: Demonstrations and protests against animal research
- Leader: National Anti-Vivisection Society (NAVS)
- World Day For Animals In Laboratories is recognized by animal rights groups and some United Nations affiliates, but it is not an official United Nations observance.

World Day For Animals In Laboratories (WDAIL; also known as World Lab Animal Day) is observed every year on 24 April. The surrounding week has come to be known as "World Week for Animals In Laboratories". The National Anti-Vivisection Society (NAVS) describes the day as an "international day of commemoration" for animals in laboratories.

== History ==
In 1979, NAVS established World Day for Laboratory Animals (also referred to as Lab Animal Day) on April 24 – Lord Hugh Dowding's birthday. This international day of commemoration is recognised by the United Nations, and is now marked annually by anti-vivisectionists on every continent. In 1980, People for the Ethical Treatment of Animals (PETA), led by PETA Founder, Ingrid Newkirk, organized the first World Day for Laboratory Animals protest in the U.S.

Today the event is marked by demonstrations and protests by groups opposed to the use of animals in research. In April 2010 protesters marched through central London calling for an end to the use of animals in research,. A similar march took place in Birmingham in 2012. and Nottingham in 2014.

World Day and World Week For Animals In Laboratories have also attracted attention from scientific groups defending the use of animals in research. On 22 April 2009 members of UCLA Pro-Test held a rally in support of biomedical research on animals, and to condemn the violence and harassment directed at faculty member Prof. David Jentsch by animal activists.

NAVS and other groups opposed to animal research have claimed that World Day For Animals In Laboratories is recognised by the United Nations. However, the day is not included on the official list of United Nations observances.

== See also ==
- World Day for the End of Fishing
- World Day for the End of Speciesism
