= Animal protection law of the People's Republic of China =

The animal protection law of the People's Republic of China/Law on the Prevention of Cruelty to Animals (experts proposal) 中华人民共和国动物保护法/反虐待动物法（专家建议稿 is a draft proposal of an animal protection law in China released on September 18, 2009. The draft was authored by a team of legal scholars led by Prof Chang Jiwen (常纪文), director of social law research department at the Chinese Academy of Social Sciences. It has yet to be adopted by the legislature. Any such law must go through the legislative process of the national legislature National People's Congress.

== Background ==
Despite the existence of wildlife protection laws in China, more and more people in China and the international community are concerned about the level of protection that animals receive in China.

== Coverage and punishments ==
The draft law mainly outlines guidelines for disease prevention and medical care for animals. It covers wildlife, farm, companion, lab, and other working animals. If enacted, it would outlaw dogs and cats consumption. It would also criminalise the torture and indiscriminate killing of animals, the feeding of zoo animals with live poultry, and some circus acts. The culling of dogs in periodic government-sponsored campaigns to eradicate rabies would be outlawed.

Various sources have proposed different punishments. Some said a fine of up to 6,000 yuan and two weeks detention for those found guilty of animal cruelty. Others have suggested 5,000 yuan fine and 15 days in jail. Organizations or units found guilty of selling cat and dog meat can be fined 10,000 to 500,000 yuan.

== Debates ==
One issue of contention is whether it is any more offensive to eat beef and lamb than cat and dog meat. Such notions may be based on cultural prejudice. For example, both the South Korean and Chinese government briefly pulled dogs off the menu from the 1988 Seoul Olympics and 2008 Beijing Olympics for westerners.

However, it is commonly acknowledged in China and elsewhere that dog and cat slaughter involves extreme cruelty to the animals, with many being skinned alive or beaten to death.

Animal welfare has also been a reason to restrict meat imports from China. As the country produced 46 million tonnes of pork in 2008, but only exported 142,000 tonnes.

Some critics in China argue that a law for animals is an indulgence when human rights problems have yet to be solved in China. Some doubt whether such a law is realistic to be implemented.

In 2025, in a survey published by the Ministry of Justice of China, 96% of citizens voted in favor of an animal anti-cruelty law. In the city of Dalian, in Northern China, 95% of citizens expressed support for support enacting companion animal protection laws.

Activists in China and around the world began calling for the introduction of animal protection legislation in China following the growth and increasing global impact of organised cat torture rings. A leading organisation on this front is a U.S.-registered charity Feline Guardians.

== See also ==
- Animal welfare and rights in China
