= Organ gifting =

Several authors have used the terms organ gifting and "tissue gifting" to describe processes behind organ and tissue transfers that are not captured by more traditional terms such as donation and transplantation. The concept of "gift of life" in the U.S. refers to the fact that "transplantable organs must be given willingly, unselfishly, and anonymously, and any money that is exchanged is to be perceived as solely for operational costs, but never for the organs themselves". "Organ gifting" is proposed to contrast with organ commodification. The maintenance of a spirit of altruism in this context has been interpreted by some as a mechanism through which the economic relations behind organ/tissue production, distribution, and consumption can be disguised. Organ/tissue gifting differs from commodification in the sense that anonymity and social trust are emphasized to reduce the offer and request of monetary compensation. It is reasoned that the implementation of the gift-giving analogy to organ transactions shows greater respect for the diseased body, honors the donor, and transforms the transaction into a morally acceptable and desirable act that is borne out of voluntarism and altruism.

== History ==
The concept of gifting with regards to body parts or fluids was first analyzed by Richard Titmuss in his book titled The Gift Relationship: from Human Blood to Social Policy. Here the author highlights the negative effects of compensating blood donors and the benefits of maintaining a system where the donation of body tissues and fluids is seen in the form of a gift that is voluntarily and altruistically given to society. Titmuss (1971) draws from Mauss's (1950) publication, The Gift: The Form and Reason for Exchange in Archaic Societies, to argue that when blood is given in the form of a gift, collective social relations are formed to maintain a sense of community. Titmuss follows Mauss' (1950) ideas of gift giving as a system of total services (production, distribution, and consumption) where self-interest interacts with social and moral obligations that are collectively imposed to maintain social relationships and guarantee the reproduction of society.

Titmuss' work was very influential at a policy level. It motivated the Nixon administration in the U.S. to reform its system of blood donation and led many people in the U.K. to oppose models of marketable blood donation systems. This concept has been incorporated into the phrase "the gift of life" which was used to refer to multiple forms of organ, blood, tissue, semen, and cell line donations. The concept of gift is widely used in policies (such as the Uniform Anatomical Gift Act) regarding organ transplantation and the use of cadavers for medical studies.

Researchers from various disciplines have analyzed and critiqued the idea of organ gifting and this belief that gifting and organ commodification are mutually exclusive. For instance, Waldby and Mitchell, in their book Tissue Economies: Blood, Organs, and Cell Lines in Late Capitalism, have indicated that "we hope to complicate and disorganize the gift-commodity dichotomy, because we consider it an inadequate way to conceptualize the political economy of tissues in the modern world of globalized biotechnology". Objects and their exchange serve multiple purposes and result in alternative values depending on the context.

Other individuals have questioned the assumptions that link systems of organ gifting with the equitable distribution of human organs arguing that the voluntary and altruistic donation of organs does not necessarily imply the free transplantation of that organ. In other words, under current systems of healthcare in the U.S., not only are organ donations managed by private organizations such as the United Network for Organ Sharing (UNOS), but organ transplantation is provided only to those who can afford it and in rare cases to those who desperately need it.

== Alienable/Inalienable possessions ==
Throughout history, human organs have acquired different characteristics, acting as both alienable and inalienable possessions depending on the temporal and spatial context. Alienable possessions are objects that can be bought and sold, while inalienable possessions are things that must be kept due to their relationships with an individual's identity and origins. During the 17th century, human organs were represented as inalienable possessions, that is, objects that could not be given away in exchange and their use by the medical profession was associated with violent actions. However, once the medical value of bodies was recognized, there was an increase in its commodification which was not legally acknowledged until the Anatomy Act, which prohibited the selling of bodies, was signed in 1832. In reality, consensus over the sale of bodies and body parts had not been reached, and as Locke as argued, "competition over corpses and body parts existed because ideas about their value and beliefs about their alienability varied among contenders". Currently, different representations of organs and other body parts coexist blurring the lines between alienability and inalienability.

== Reciprocity ==
Marcel Mauss is recognized as one of the first authors interested in the study of gift economies. His main concern centered on individuals' need to provide gifts and the obligations to reciprocate them. He identified human obligation to give, receive, and reciprocate as the most important factor in the creation and maintenance of social ties. Reciprocation was mainly produced by the insertion of the giver's identity in the object that was given. The object maintained this essence (referred to as hau or mana by Mauss) of the giver which needed to return to him/her through reciprocation in the form of a counter-gift (another object, services, person, agreements, etc.).

Organ gifting entails two simultaneous gifts: the gift of the organ itself and the gift of life. The first form of gift is a transaction where the giver provides an object to the receiver. This action leads to the creation of a relationship among individuals where the receiver is compelled to provide a counter-gift. The obligation to return the gift has received various interpretations, but one common assumption is that the object that is given tends to keep a portion of the identity of the giver (hau used by Mauss). In the case of organ gifting, this personalization of the gifted object reaches extreme proportions because the gift is actually a piece of the giver's body.

Reciprocity tends to be discouraged in contemporary organ gifting, thus creating an irresoluble sense of debt in the receiver. This separation of the donor from the object being given was not always implemented, and in earlier cases of organ transplantation the receiver could obtain information from the donor and even meet. As Holtkamp (2002) has argued, this arrangement created a feeling of debt in the receiver (and close kin) and led to the creation of obligations. The discouragement of reciprocal relationships between giver and receiver is produced through what Sharp (2001) has labeled etiquettes of dehumanization where the identities of the donors are removed from the organs.

Organs, then, become unreciprocated gifts. According to Mauss, the unreciprocated gift makes the person who has accepted it inferior, especially when its acceptance is done without the thought of returning it. In Mauss' words, "Charity is still wounding for him who has accepted it, and the whole tendency of our morality is to strive to do away with the unconscious and injurious patronage of the rich almsgiver".

The prohibition, or in some cases delay, of the giver/receiver interaction creates a myriad of situations. The dehumanization of organs and the removal of all possible donor characteristics do not prevent receivers from imagining the lives of the individuals who provided the organs. Studies have shed light on cases where organ receivers feel the essence of the organ donors inside them after transplantation. The close kin of donors who have died also maintain the idea that the person in their family who has died continues to live in the body of someone else.

Organ gifting entails not only the gifting of the organ itself, but also the "gift of life". In this case, the organ not only represents the transference of an object from one person to the other as it was mentioned earlier, but the possession of this object in turn allows the receiver to obtain a second "gift", the opportunity to live. The obligation to reciprocate is still present in this form of gifting, but the possibility of providing a counter-gift of equal or greater value is practically impossible. The use of the metaphor "gift of life" transforms the nature of the object into a mystical one as the implication is that life emanates from a supernatural source. This is further exacerbated by the use of this same metaphor to express religious beliefs like rebirth and reincarnation.

== Value ==
Discussions over value are common in studies on organ gifting. As Lock has indicated, the main reason for this is that "human body parts do not have universal value, and once, potentially available for conversion into circulating commodities, their worth, and more basically the question of whether or not they are alienable, is open to dispute". An important factor to consider is the fact that organ gifting differs from the gifting of blood or semen in the sense that organs are scarce. It is this scarcity which creates stronger relationships between the giver and the receiver because it endows the object that is being transferred with greater value. As Arjun Appadurai (1986) has indicated, the link between exchange and value is created by politics, thus making value an issue of judgment. In the case of organ exchange, when the demand, whether real or fictitious, exceeds the supply, the object is endowed with greater value. In other words, objects can be controlled to create value. Several authors have examined the issue of organ scarcity pointing to the different ways in which it is publicly exacerbated for profit-driven interests.

Another factor that can increase the value of the object, are the characteristics of the object itself. As Sahlins (1972) has indicated, the material exchanged influences the relationship of exchange. Spielman (2002) has discussed four main qualities of social valuables that also allude to the different ways in which the object exchanged can determine the relationship maintained between the giver and receiver: 1. Social valuables must have unique properties that distinguish their production 2. Distance, in terms of obtaining the materials necessary for production, plays a role in the establishment of value 3. The transformative aspects of production and the role of craftspeople need to be considered in the creation of value 4. Value is also influenced by the modifications the good suffers as it circulates.

This last point has been examined by Appadurai through his concept of the social lives of objects where objects are seen as circulating in different regimes of value in space and time. As Appadurai has indicated, "commodity is not one kind of thing rather than another, but one phase in the life of some things". In the case of organ gifting, it is possible to see the biographical transformations of objects in clearer form as the object in question comes from a person and becomes part of another person. Organs can be both gifts and commodities depending on the context in question. The value of the object responds to the social relationships and contracts present in this context. This is the reason why not all organ gifting is visualized in the same form and individuals make distinctions between cadaveric donations, kin donations, and anonymous donations.

Furthermore, organ gifting raises additional concerns regarding the biographies of objects because the object that is given is actually a part of another person. The interest over the life of the object includes an interest over the life of the individual who provided it as well. This has been documented by researchers examining the processes through which organ procurers select donors. As Sharp has indicated, "through organ procurement, human bodies are commodified and codified following a relatively strict hierarchy of medical value and social worth". Age, race and ethnicity all play a role in the identification of ideal candidates. Organ receivers are also interested in obtaining information about donors. As Lock has mentioned, "organ recipients worry about the gender, ethnicity, skin color, personality and social status of their donors, and many believe that their mode of being-in-the-world is radically changed after a transplant, thanks to the power of diffusing form the organ they have received".

== Altruism ==
Altruism is constantly referenced by proponents of organ gifting. Authors such as Sahlins (1972), incorporated Maussian concepts of gifting and reciprocity and expanded them to describe three different types of transactions: generalized reciprocity (system of giving without taking account of how much is given), balanced reciprocity (direct exchange, expectation of equal value), and negative reciprocity (obtaining something for nothing). Individuals engage in each one of these transaction depending on the person they are exchanging with and the social distance involved. Sahlins' (1972) work has pointed to the need to examine the different types of relationships behind gift-giving and the characteristics of the transaction. In the case of generalized reciprocity, altruistic relationships are present and the expectation of reciprocity is indefinite.

The value of the object can be increased by the way in which it is given and several authors have pointed to the fact that organs given in altruistic manner acquire greater social worth. Organs given in altruistic manner are thought to say something about the moral character of the people who give them. Furthermore, the giving of organs without any form of compensation erases the possibility that the giver will have any form of vested interest in the transaction.

Munson has presented a list of the common claims made by individuals arguing against the selling of kidneys: "a paid donor loses the psychological benefits that reward a voluntary donor; the practice reduces altruism in the society; the quality of donated kidneys will decline; the donor may suffer harm and become a burden to society; selling a kidney involves putting a price on the priceless; organ selling treats the human body as a commodity and thus reduces our respect for people". It is believed that the commodification of organ donations could lead the organ donors to lie on issues pertaining to their health in order to obtain money in exchange for their organs, thus making the quality of the organ questionable. A direct relationship between commodification and quality is thus created where the social trust present in altruistic relationships is missing. Goodwin has argued that this distinction between commodification and altruism is based on a common assumption socially maintained regarding altruism where it is thought as "pure and unspoiled by secondary or spurious motivations".

== Anonymity ==
Anonymity is an important component of organ gifting and it is thought to foster the social well-being of donors, recipients, and close kin. Anonymity is related to the eradication of reciprocal relations between giver and receiver where the origin of the object that is exchanged is erased by eliminating the identity of the giver. According to some authors, this is currently done to promote better coping mechanisms for the recipient and close kin as well as to maintain standardized operating procedures by organ procurers. The idea is that anonymity will protect organ procurers "from close encounters with the animistic, magic-infused thinking about transplanted organs in which the givers and receivers of cadaver organs often engage". However, other authors have argued that the use of the gift-giving metaphor in conjunction with the enforcement of anonymous donations lead to the obscuring of the origins of body parts and the unequal power relations behind their donation and reception.

== Works cited ==
- Appadurai, Arjun – (1986). Introduction: Commodities and the Politics of Value. In The Social Life of Things: Commodities in Cultural Perspective. A. Appadurai, ed. pp. 3–63. Cambridge, U.K.: Cambridge University Press.
- Cherry, Mark – (2003). Kidney for Sale by Owner: Human Organs, Transplantation, and the Market. Washington, D.C.: Georgetown University Press.
- Fox, R. and J. Swazey – (1992). Spare Parts: Organ Replacement in American Society. New York: Oxford University Press.
- Godelier, Maurice – (1999). The Enigma of the Gift. Chicago: University of Chicago Press.
- Goodwin, Michele – (2006). Black Markets: The Supply and Demand of Body Parts. Cambridge: Cambridge University Press.
- Holtkamp, Sue – (2002). Wrapped in Mourning: The Gift of Life and Organ Donor Family Trauma. Taylor and Francis Group.
- Lock, Margaret – (2002). The Alienation of Body Tissue and the Biopolitics of Immortalized Cell Lines. In Commodifying Bodies, Nancy Scheper-Hughes and Loic Wacquant, eds. pp. 63–91. London: SAGE.
- Mauss, Marcel – (1950). The Gift. The Form and Reason for Exchange in Archaic Societies. New York: W.W. Norton.
- Munson, Ronald – (2002). Raising the Dead: Organ Transplants, Ethics, and Society. Oxford: Oxford University Press.
- Randhawa, Gurch – (2000). The 'Gift' of Body Organs. In Social Policy and the Body: Transitions in Corporeal Discourse, Kathryn Ellis and Hartley Dean, eds. pp. 45–62. London: Macmillan Press.
- Sahlins, Marshall – (1972). On the Sociology of Primitive Exchange. In Stone Age Economics. M. Sahlins, ed. pp. 185–230. New York: Aldine de Gruyter.
- Scheper-Hughes, Nancy – (2002). Commodity Fetishism in Organs Trafficking. In Commodifying Bodies, Nancy Scheper-Hughes and Loic Wacquant, eds. pp. 31–62. London: SAGE.
- Sharp, Lesley – (2001). Commodified Kin: Death, Mourning, and Competing Claims on the Bodies of Organ Donors in the United States. American Anthropologist 103(1):112-133.
- Spielman, Katherine – (2002). Feasting, Craft Specialization, and the Ritual Mode of Production in Small-Scale Societies. American Anthropologist 104(1):195-207.
- Titmuss, Richard – (1971). The Gift Relationship: From Human Blood to Social Policy. New York: Pantheon Books.
- Tober, Diane – (2001). Semen as Gift, Semen as Goods: Reproductive Workers and the Market in Altruism. Body and Society 7(2-3): 137–160.
- Waldby, Catherine and Robert Mitchell – (2006). Tissue Economies: Blood, Organs, and Cell Lines in Late Capitalism. Durham: Duke University Press.
- Weiner, Annette – (1992). Inalienable Possessions: The Paradox of Keeping-While-Giving. Berkeley: University of California Press.
- Wilk, Richard and Lisa Cliggett – (2007). Economies and Cultures: Foundations of Economic Anthropology. Cambridge: Westview Press.
- Wilkinson, Stephen – (2003). Bodies for Sale: Ethics and Exploitation in the Human Body Trade. New York: Routledge.
