= Chinese Animal Protection Network =

Chinese non-profit organization

- Chinese Animal Protection Network
- Abbreviation: CAPN
- Formation: 2004; 22 years ago
- Founder: Dr. Jenia Meng
- Type: Nonprofit
- Legal status: Non-governmental organization
- Region served: China (Global network)
- Members: 48 member groups, 2 branches, 20,000+ individual supporters (2008)
- Founder: Dr. Jenia Meng
- Subsidiaries: Chinese Companion Animal Protection Network (CCAPN)
- Funding: World Animal Protection, Culture & Animals Foundation
- Website: https://www.capn-online.info/en.php
- Remarks: Known for launching APpedia (Chinese encyclopedia of animal protection) and POVchina.

Chinese Animal Protection Network (CAPN) is a non-profit animal protection organization, and the first network for animal protection in China, founded by Chinese people. CAPN is known for its pioneering role in the animal rights movement in China and providing a free encyclopedia on animal welfare information.

== History ==
The Chinese Animal Protection Network was founded by Dr. Jenia Meng in 2004, with its first project, the Chinese Companion Animal Protection Network. Since then, the organization has initiated projects targeting issues such as lab animal rights, vegetarianism, and opposition to indiscriminate culling as a method of population control of animals. Those projects have led the direction of Chinese non-governmental organizations.

By 2008, the organization had 48 member groups, two branches, and more than 20,000 individual supporters. The organization reported on its website in 2014, that its network has expanded to reach almost every part of China, with more than 200 partner groups around world.

== Philosophy ==
CAPN has a science-based philosophy of animal rights. They oppose violence in the animal rights movement, and see animal rights as a dynamic concept; they believe the rights of different animals are different because their needs are different. Six keys of the organization's philosophy, developed in 2008, include:

- unity: the philosophy of animal rights is a part of a universal law; scientific disciplines such as mathematics, physics, chemistry, and biology have shown through the years that the universe is interrelated.
- complexity: everyone has his/her own view of animal rights. Different organizations, academics, and even animal rights activists have different viewpoints; when working with people and organizations, one should always keep in mind this diversity of viewpoints.
- evolution: human understanding of animal rights is evolving, as with all other areas of human knowledge. Science and technology is developing to help humans better understand the universe and their place in the universe; it is natural that our understanding of animal rights will continue to evolve.
- continuity: continuity exists between everything, from human to nonhuman animals, from more human-related animals to less related animals. The difference is not discrete but gradual. CAPN advocates to analyze specific issues, due to the different needs of individual animals.
- originality: the concept of animal rights is not a new concept, as three pillars of traditional Chinese thought, Buddhism, Taoism, and Confucianism, all have teachings regarding respect towards animals.

== Projects ==
=== Chinese Companion Animal Protection Network ===
The Chinese Companion Animal Protection Network (CCAPN) was launched in 2004 at the founding of CAPN. The campaign against eating cats and dogs was the first concern of CCAPN. "Isolated animal welfare organisations were already working to rescue strays by then, but consumption of dogs and cats hadn't made it onto their agenda. Indeed, these groups were unconvinced that stopping people from eating one or two particular species was anything but an exercise in arbitrary morality. So CAPN sought to reframe the debate as one about cruelty rather than taste," thereby working to reduce the consumer market. Supported by international groups including the Royal Society for the Prevention of Cruelty to Animals and World Animal Protection, the organization worked to link animal-lovers across China and educate the public about the facts of the trade, for example that "many of the 10,000 cats consumed daily in winter in Guangdong province (where the meat is considered a warming food) are stolen from other provinces".

In 2007, the organization "launched an online 'signing event' which asked people to pledge to avoid cat and dog meat in future. In the following five months, it collected 21,000 signatures."

CCAPN's website in 2014 offers information on controlling rabies in dog populations through vaccination rather than culling, information on controlling domestic cat populations in urban areas through trap-neuter-return rather than culling, and how to create an animal protection agency.

=== Animal Rights website and encyclopedia ===
The Animal Rights in China website was launched on 22 July 2006, and is the major portal for animal rights issues in China. Academic research on animal ethics and networking of animal rights activists are important functions of this project. It is developing a Chinese online encyclopedia of animal protection (APpedia).

The main objective of APpedia (Chinese: ARC中文动保小百科) was to establish an online Chinese encyclopedia of animal protection. The project currently has more than 90 academic researchers and affiliated organizations around world.

APpedia is published online as a free-of-charge eBook and a website. The content of the APpedia includes, but is not limited to: Science, religion, events, animal behavior, philosophy, important figures, animal protection, advocacy, animal welfare, animal rights, animal protection organizations, reviews of books.

The beta version of APpedia website was launched in 2007, as a wiki website, visitors are allowed to modify the articles on the website without registration. Overall the project has a pro animal rights position. A derivative of the project, a book with the same title, was published 2009 in Australia.

The sponsors of the free knowledge project include World Society for the Protection of Animals and Culture & Animals Foundation.

=== POVchina ===
POVchina is an information portal for vegetarianisms. It is known for using interactive computer games in public education.

== Notable contributions ==
- CAPN works closely with domestic, international, and overseas organizations working in China, providing advice and support for their work.
- CAPN runs a campaign against cat-and-dog-eating (the practice of eating cat meat or dog meat). They are the first group to use the slogan 'Stop eating cats and dogs' in their campaign. They also coordinated many groups in more than ten cities in China to join this campaign. This slogan has been adopted by animal rights groups around the country. They launched the online-signing event against consumption of cat and dog meat in 2007, which received over 40,000 signatures. Their campaign has led to a large amount of publicity and discussion of this issue among the public.
- CAPN runs a campaign against animal hoarding. They led a large-scale online debate on the topic in 2006, and later published two research documents regarding animal hoarding, the first of their kind to be published in Chinese. They are the major contributors to a change in the pro-hoarding climate of China.
- CAPN provides a network for animal protection groups. They are the first organization devoted to the unity of Chinese animal protection communities.
- In April 2008, CAPN introduced World Lab Animal Day to China for the first time.

== Awards ==
CAPN projects have won several awards:

- January 2008: CCAPN won 'great contribution to animal protection in 2007' award in 'Animals in China' Shanghai conference.
- March 2008: ARC won funding for its online encyclopedia from Cultural and Animal Foundation, which is established and chaired by animal rights philosopher Tom Regan.

== See also ==
- Animal welfare and rights in China
