= Feline Guardians =

Animal welfare organization

- Feline Guardian Awareness-Raising Poster
- Formation: 2023
- Founded: 2025
- Fields: Feline welfare, Feline protection
- President: Lara Bruce
- Board of directors: Balázs Gimes, Jo Nielson
- Affiliations: Apolitical
- Website: http://felineguardians.org
- Formerly called: Feline Guardians Without Borders

Feline Guardians is a 501(c)(3) non-profit, apolitical organization registered in the United States focused on preventing the abuse of cats. It has been cited as an important organization to combat the activity of organized cat-torture groups.

== Mission ==
The Feline Guardians website states that the organization "strive[s] toward a world where every cat is treated with the love, respect, and dignity they deserve".

Feline Guardians focuses specifically on feline torture and abuse prevention. The organization also works to stop the spread of cat torture material online, while raising public awareness of the crisis and advocating for stronger law enforcement response. One of the focus countries is China, which advocates have urged to introduce animal protection laws.

== Organized cat-torture networks ==
The first documented proof of an organized cat-torture network was found in 2021–2022, when a disturbing phenomenon gained popularity, primarily among young men, involving individuals filming themselves torturing cats and kittens and sharing these videos online. The trend grew partly due to the absence of specific anti-animal cruelty laws in China, where the phenomenon originated, leading to the creation of "communities" that consume and distribute such content online. Membership of such groups can reach 1000 active participants at any time. Members share torture methods, coordinate acts of cruelty, and circulate video recordings. They often adopt or snatch cats from the streets, with recorded incidents of pet theft.

In the spring of 2023, one of these torture videos was posted on a Western social media platform X, kick-starting the global reach of these cruelty networks.

In China, volunteers work to combat the spread of this phenomenon.

Between May 2023 and May 2024, per Feline Guardians reporting, a new torture video was published every 14 hours and 34 minutes on average. By February 2025, upload frequency had increased by 510%, with a new video every 2 hours 38 minutes.

== History ==
On 17 March 2023, internet celebrity "Jack Latiao" tortured a black and white cat, nicknamed "Cowcat" by anti-cruelty advocates, for 3 days, before killing her. In response to the spreading abuse and directly as a result of the "Cowcat" torture video, Feline Guardians' founder, a woman known to the community as Doris, launched Feline Guardians on Instagram in 2023. Together with Feline Guardians co-founder, known by the name CFL, they began receiving help from various supporters from around the world who assisted informally, without any formal roles or titles.

In summer 2025, the founders of Feline Guardians transferred the domain, ownership and credentials to Lara Bruce, current president of the organization. On 29 August 2025, Feline Guardians was officially registered as a public benefits corporation in Wyoming, United States. On 12 November 2025, trademark applications have been filed in the United States. On 14 January 2026, the organization received announcement of 501(c)(3) acceptance, which was retroactive to the date of the Public Benefits Corporation registration.

== Activities ==
Feline Guardians focuses on documenting the spread of feline abuse content online, supporting established organizations to create stronger laws protecting cats, and educating the public about this crisis.

Feline Guardians has developed structured research and reporting pipelines, working with relevant experts and authorities. It conducts diplomatic outreach and advocacy, as well as awareness-raising activities both offline and online.

In the United States, Feline Guardians found evidence of a crossover between cat torture and neo-Nazi groups; for example, within a Telegram group called "The Eternal Reich" with more than 600 members, which mixed torture content with videos of abuse of women and content on far-right philosophy.

== Membership ==
Active volunteers of Feline Guardians come from all around the world, including China. The organization grew from a social media account managed by Doris into a structured charity that requires volunteer registration and operates with full transparency, following community guidelines that prioritize ethical and legal activities.

== Partnerships ==
Feline Guardians is a long-standing collaborator of organizations such as Nexus, In Defence of Animals, Four Paws, Lady Freethinker, RSPCA, SPCA, and SMACC.

== Accomplishments ==
- Feline Guardians is the primary organization that has contributed to awareness-raising about feline abuse globally.
- Identification of groups sharing the torture content around the world.
- Cooperation with law enforcement authorities in multiple countries outside of China to fight abuse crimes, for example in the United States.
- Identification and reporting of feline abusers within China to Chinese law enforcement, which ensured their removal from the online Chinese abuse community.
- Collection of 12,000 pieces of footage over three years to document and report the abuse.
- Support of a successful undercover operation to identify the legal name of the lead administrator of the Chinese torture group aimaotv, carried out by two female volunteers in 2024 and later reported on by the BBC.
- Embassy meeting with Chinese officials in Belgium in 2024 between Feline Guardians Official Belgium Representative Lena Anna Kuklińska and representatives of the Chinese Cultural Department.
- Partnership with policy makers in several countries, for example, The Netherlands.
- Tens of peaceful demonstrations in countries around the world, including vigils and memorials honoring feline victims.
