= Animal welfare and rights in China =

The People's Republic of China has limited animal protections by international standards, and animal-rights activists have condemned the treatment of animals in the country. Protests and movement towards animal welfare and animal rights have expanded in China, but face resistance from the Chinese government.

== Regulation ==
In the late 1950s, the PRC increased state control over the trade of wild animals classified as national treasures. China's first national policy frame work for wild animal conservation was the September 1962 Instructions of the State Council on the Active Protection and Rational Utilization of Wild Animal Resources. The directive primarily aimed to regulate hunting to ensure that animal stocks were not exhausted, noting that wild animals were an important source of protein as well as products that "have played an important role in improving people's lives and generating foreign currency." It emphasized the idea that "wild animals are the country's natural wealth".

There are currently no nationwide laws in China that explicitly prohibit the mistreatment of animals, except for a more generic law protecting wildlife. However, World Animal Protection notes that some legislation protecting the welfare of animals exists in certain contexts, especially ones used in research and in zoos.

In 2006, Zhou Ping of the National People's Congress introduced a proposal for a nationwide animal-protection law in China, but it did not move forward.

In September 2009, the first comprehensive Animal protection law of the People's Republic of China was drafted, but it has not made any progress as of 2013.

In 2014, China received an E out of possible grades A, B, C, D, E, F, G on World Animal Protection's Animal Protection Index. That same year, Chinese law was amended so as to drop the mandatory requirement of testing cosmetics on animals for all Chinese-made cosmetic products, though the law still required imported cosmetics to be tested on animals in order to be legally sold in China.

In 2020, after it became known that the COVID-19 pandemic initially identified in China, could have been transmitted through wet markets selling wild animals, the Chinese government announced a temporary ban on the transportation and sale of wildlife in late January, before later announcing an indefinite (albeit still considered 'temporary') prohibition of both consumption and trade in late February, pending more comprehensive measures via an amendment to the wildlife protection law. Authorities across the country raided and shut down wet markets that sold wild or live animals. Experts cited by Business Insider noted that much of the wildlife trade was already considered illegal prior to 2020, but wet markets operated via a combination of lax enforcement and legal loopholes, which the wildlife protection law amendment sought to close.

In early April 2020, the city of Shenzhen went further in its crackdown against wet markets by completely and indefinitely banning both the sale and consumption of cat meat and dog meat, starting from 1 May that year. The local government stated that the law was based not only on public health concerns, but also on evolving moral and ethical values. About a week later, the Chinese National Medical Products Administration announced that mandatory animal tests on imported cosmetics would end, as it had approved nine non-animal based test methods for the certification of cosmetics imports. It also stated that the non-animal based testing methods would be 'preferred' by the authorities as the primary method for certifying the safety of both manufactured and imported cosmetics.

== History ==
Several traditional Chinese worldviews emphasize caring for animals, including Taoism and Buddhist vegetarianism. Taoist Zhuang Zhou taught compassion for all sentient beings.

For more modern times, Prof. Peter J. Li said in 2012 that many in mainland China had possibly become indifferent to animal suffering, because of Mao Zedong's campaigns against what he considered "bourgeois sentimentality". Focusing attention to animal welfare was regarded as "counter-revolutionary", because he believed it would detract focus from the broader push for Communism, which was meant to deliver equality for all. Since 1978, China had emphasized growth and avoidance of famine, which the government considered important for political stability. Local officials were often evaluated based on local jobs and revenue. This, Li claimed, had led to less concern for animal welfare. However, he also noted that the younger generation who were not so influenced by the past ideology and hardship during the time were generally far more sensitive to suffering, including those of animals.

Some, such as the late Tsinghua University professor Zhao Nanyuan, have argued that the political focus on promoting animal welfare concerns could serve foreign interests. Zhao warned that animal welfare activism could be used as a tool of neo-imperialism and encouraged China to learn from the example of South Koreans who refused Western protests of its dog-meat traditions. However, his views have been challenged by other Chinese scholars and activists, who argue for an increased focus on improving animal welfare, animal rights, and the importance of legal reforms.

== Animals used for food ==
=== Livestock ===
Livestock farming has grown exponentially in China in recent years, such that China is now "the world's biggest animal farming nation". In 1978, China collectively consumed 1/3 as much meat as the United States. By 1992 China had caught up, and by 2012, China's meat consumption was more than double that of the U.S. By 2021, China was reported to be the "world's largest consumer meat market", although its consumption per capita was still lower than that of the U.S. and other Western countries.

A 2005–2006 survey by Prof. Peter J. Li found that many farming methods that the European Union was trying to reduce or eliminate were commonplace in China, including gestation crates, battery cages, foie gras, early weaning of cows, and clipping of ears/beaks/tails. Livestock in China may have been transported over long distances, and there were currently no humane-slaughter requirements.

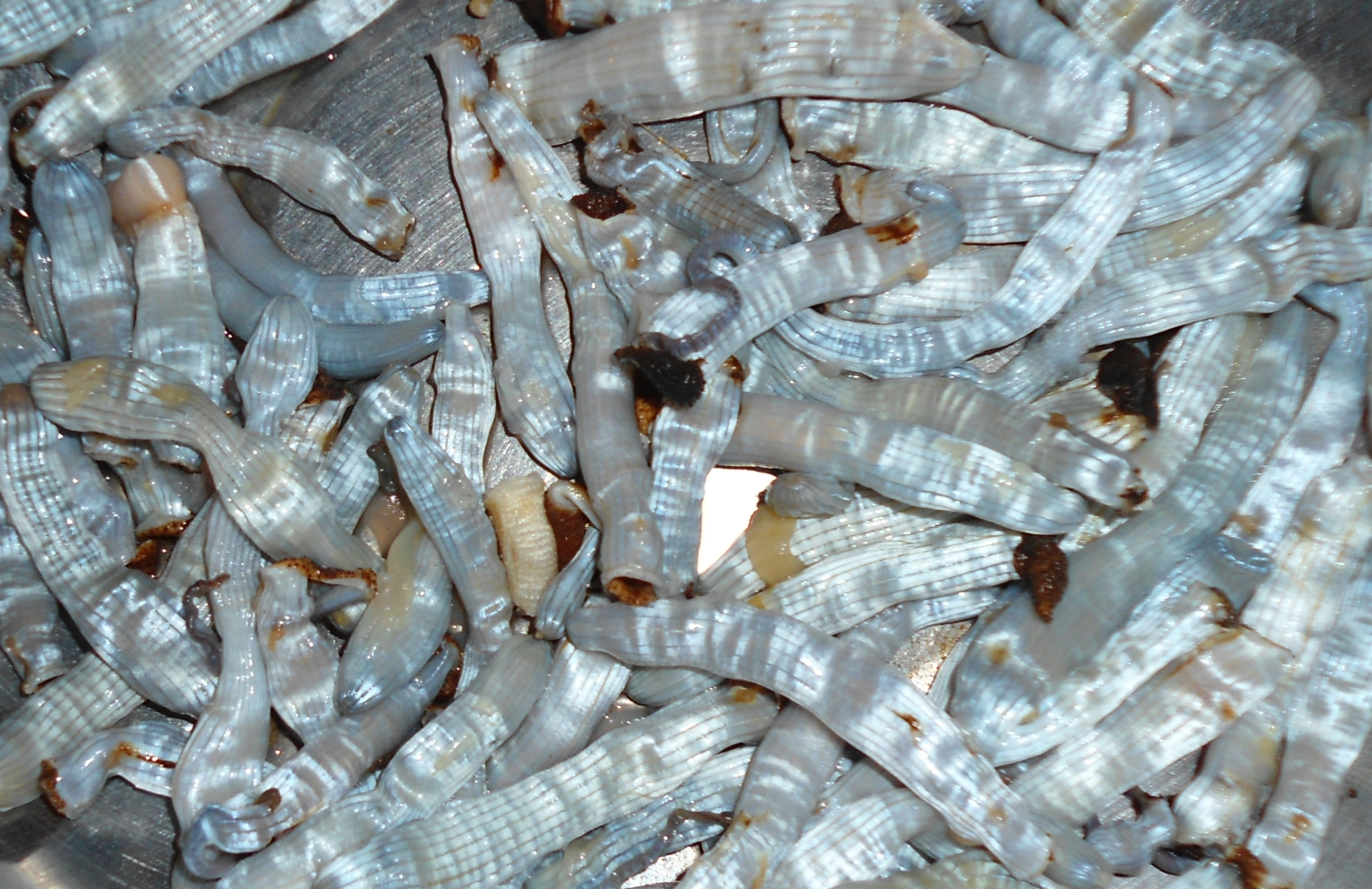
Marine animals in a market in Hainan Province, China

Almost 3/4 of China's meat is pork, and China's 476 million pigs comprise half of the world's pig population. China produces 37 million tons of farmed fish—more than 60% of the world's total. In 2017, one of the country's largest agricultural producers, Da Bei Nong, signed an agreement with the International Cooperation Committee of Animal Warfare to improve the quality of life for its millions of pigs through increased roaming space and better flooring. A 2016 survey from the committee also suggests that two thirds of Chinese shoppers would pay more for pork that had been treated well while another one from the World Animal Protection indicated that almost 90% of respondents would be willing to change their purchasing habits for pork from pigs that had lived better lives.

=== Controversial practices and incidents ===
The 2010 documentary San Hua by Guo Ke was the first to depict China's cat-meat industry. In one scene, Guo and fellow activists stopped a transport truck to find "more than 300 cats crammed into cramped wooden cages, unable to move"—some missing tails and others "crushed into unconsciousness". For another scene at Fa's Cat Restaurant in Kaiping, Guo used a hidden camera to film cooks beating cats with a wooden stick, dumping them into a fur-removal machine, and then boiling them. A cook at the restaurant claimed: "The worse you treat them the better they taste. It makes sure the blood gets into the meat and it tastes delicious." Reports from 2013 and 2015 suggested that although the consumption of cat meat was widely considered taboo in China, it was still eaten in some rural and southern regions.

Online tabloid newspapers widely shared a video in September 2016 of a greyhound-type dog being forced into a large barrel of boiling water. An article on The Telegraph stated that dogs are intentionally tortured in such ways to improve the taste of their meat. A couple other reports have stated that since 2015 there has been little evidence for those allegations. Growing publicity around such incidents, as well as increasing pet ownership, has led to disapproval of the dog and cat meat trade, amongst most surveyed Chinese, with supply and demand of those markets on a steady decline.

Yin Yang fish involves deep-frying fish while it is still alive. The practice has been condemned by animal-rights activists. Many chefs in Taiwan are no longer willing to prepare it, but according to the defunct China Post, it has been popular in mainland China. In 2009, a video of diners consuming this dish went viral on YouTube and provoked an outcry from PETA.

== Non-meat farming ==
=== Bile bears ===
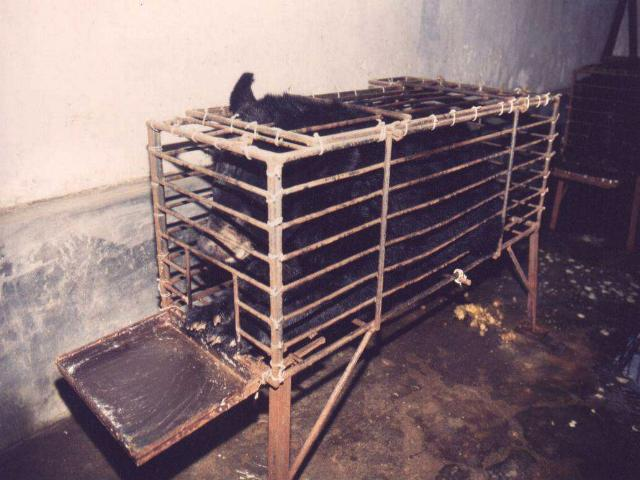
A black bear inside a "crush cage" made for bile extraction

China farms about 10,000 Asiatic black bears for bile production—an industry worth roughly $1.6 billion per year. The bears are permanently kept in cages, and bile is extracted from cuts in their stomachs. In January 2013, Animals Asia Foundation rescued six bile bears, which had broken and rotted teeth due to gnawing at their cages. Bloomberg Businessweek reported in 2013 that over 40,000 shops in all of China sold bear bile.

Earthtrust reported in 1994 that although China had outlawed the trade and hunting of bear parts in 1989, their trade was still widespread and fuelled by the "growing spending power of a small portion of the population [and] continued demand for contraband products from Taiwanese, Korean and other foreign nationals". In the same year, due to pressure from animal rights groups, the Chinese government reportedly agreed to stop issuing legal licenses for bear farmers.

Jackie Chan and Yao Ming have publicly opposed bear farming. In 2012, an IPO application by Fujian Guizhentang Pharmaceutical Co. caused social media outrage in China along with a petition which involved over 70 Chinese celebrities opposing it due to the company's selling of bear-bile medicines. Fang Shuting, the head of a TCM organisation affiliated with Guizhentang defended the bile harvesting process while a staffer at Guizhentang denied allegations of cruelty in a demonstration of the process. In 2013, the company pulled its IPO application.

According to Animals Asia in 2014, over 1,900 Chinese medicine stores have committed to not selling bear bile. A 2016 online survey indicated that 98% of the Chinese respondents regarded the bile farming as cruel, with 90% saying they would never use or buy the product and 84% supporting an outright ban. It was also reported on Tencent back in 2011 that online opinion polls generally had 90% of respondents supporting the elimination of bear farming.

=== Fur ===
China has been reported as the biggest fur-producing nation, and the second largest producer next to Europe. Nordic fur industries had reportedly played a key role in expanding fur farming in China. Prof. Peter Li said in 2012 that fur animals were sometimes beaten to death with sticks on small farms or skinned alive. However, he also said that the Chinese government had been working to standardize slaughtering procedures. Similar issues were reported in other countries producing fur. A report in 2015 stated that increasing ethical awareness from Chinese consumers as well as quality problems with fur products have forced the industry closer towards international standards. Fashion manager Elena Salvaneschi in 2019 also brought up that animal welfare was improving in the Chinese fur industry.

In November 2013, PETA released a video of a live angora rabbit in northeastern China having their fur torn off. The video received 200,000 views on China's video site Youku within a month and prompted UK retailers like Primark and Topshop to stop imports from China of products using angora wool.

== Animal testing ==
In 2006, China issued the Guidelines on the Humane Treatment of Laboratory Animals. These guidelines mention, for the first time in China's formal policy and regulations, the words "animal welfare". This regulation was issued in addition to other laboratory animal-related policies in China like the 1988 Statute on the Administration of Laboratory Animals, 1997 Laboratory Animal Development Program for the Ninth Five-Year Plan, the 2005 Guidelines on Beijing Municipality on the Review of Welfare and Ethics of Laboratory Animals. Unlike the 1988 Statute on the Administration of Laboratory Animals which focuses solely on controlling the quality of the laboratory animals being tested on, the Guidelines on the Humane Treatment of Laboratory Animals officially expands into the realm of animal welfare and protection through addressing problems in procurement, husbandry, environmental conditions, experimental usage and transportation.

A particular focus that the Guidelines on the Humane Treatment of Laboratory Animals has is on animal suffering. Concerning the level of pain that laboratory animals feel during the experimental process, the Guidelines require that pain and panic be inflicted as little as possible. Pain relief medication and anesthesia must be prescribed to laboratory animals undergoing procedures like surgery and dissection. When the animal is deemed unusable for further testing, the Guidelines also require that the lives of the animals be ended humanely.

Many scientists like Jianfei Wang, the director of laboratory animal science at GlaxoSmithKline Research and Development Center in China, maintain that China has made considerable progress to work towards animal protection and welfare, especially considering that the concept of laboratory animal science did not exist in China until the late twentieth century. According to Wang, international collaboration with research institutions have brought animal welfare concepts from abroad back to China. Additionally, as China gets more involved in international trade, there are many pressures placed on China throughout the world over concerns for animal welfare and protection. For example, organizations like PETA were instrumental with stopping a shipment research primates from Chinese laboratories to Los Angeles, the U.S.'s largest port of entry for research primates. Major airlines such as Air China and China Eastern Airlines have also joined in on the global challenge of stopping laboratory tests on animals like primates and rodents. China's entry in the World Trade Organization could also be stymied if adequate progress is not made towards pressuring Chinese laboratories to follow international regulations for laboratory animal welfare.

China has also felt domestic pressures to give laboratory animals more protection. In 2007, a photo taken by Li Feng depicting captive primates in cages waiting to be tested on won prizes in the economy and science categories in the China International Press Photo Contest. Such glimpses into the conditions that laboratory animals in China are subject to have sparked outrage amongst the Chinese population and cries for further reform.

Despite foreign and domestic pressures, the country still uses, on average, about 12 to 13 million laboratory animals every year, with many being used towards making advances in drug and medical discovery. Because international research institutions and companies face strict laws regarding ensuring the welfare of laboratory animals, many of these institutions and companies look towards China as the place to outsource animal testing and as a market for buying research animals. However, some animals are also being tested for cosmetic purposes as well. China has a $32 billion beauty market, and over 300,000 animals are thought to be used each year for required product tests. According to Bloomberg Businessweek in 2013, China was the only major buyer where mascaras and lotions need to be tested on animals.

In 2013, the China Food and Drug Administration (CFDA) relaxed its testing requirements by allowing Chinese companies to verify safety using data from overseas tests, including non-animal tests. Foreign companies are still required to perform animal testing, but Humane Society International was hopeful about further humane reforms to come.

On 30 June 2014, CFDA eliminated its requirement for animal testing of "ordinary cosmetics" like shampoos and some skin-care items as long as companies provided alternative data showing safety. This change does not extend to imported cosmetics or to "any special-use products, including hair dyes and sunblocks". Some animal tests are likely to continue for now even on exempt products because some testers do not have the technology for alternative in vitro methods. Animal activists were excited by the announcement, and over 50 of them took to the streets of Dalian in northeastern China to celebrate, wearing bunny ears.

China implemented laws in 2021 making animal testing no longer required for imports of "regular cosmetics", which included general skincare and haircare. "Special cosmetics" such as sunscreen, hair dye and skin-whitening products were not included in the laws and still required testing. Harvard International Review noted how the U.S. and China both had a fairly limited legal framework on animal testing, opining that "a higher level of democracy does not necessarily correspond to progressiveness in animal welfare laws." According to TRT World in 2026, animal testing remains not banned in countries like China and Japan, where "some [cosmetic] products still face certain specific animal testing regulations".

== Zoos ==
According to Prof. Peter J. Li, a few Chinese zoos are improving their welfare practices, but many remain "outdated", have poor conditions, use live feeding, and employ animals for performances.

There have been times in which local and international online pressure have prompted zoos to improve their animals' conditions voluntarily. Organizations such as the Animals Asia Foundation have frequently worked with zoos to improve housing and enrichment programs for their animals, as well as spread education to public awareness. Recent major examples including Grandview Aquarium (2016) the closing of the Hanoi Zoo Animal Circus (2016), and various campaigns backed and publicized by the Beijing Zoo.

== Other animal rights issues ==
In the mid-2010s, in Beijing, vendors sold fish, turtles, and amphibians as key rings and mobile-phone decorations. This practice received condemnation both within China and overseas. Animal-rights activists condemned the practice, stating that the animals may run out of air and die quickly, and they may also pose hazards to human health.

== Animal rights activism in China ==
Ideas of animal welfare and animal rights were further introduced to mainland China in the early 1990s.

"In many ways, the animal welfare movement in China is maturing far faster than it ever did in the West."

— Jill Robinson

China's animal-protection movement is growing, particularly among young people, especially those in urban areas and on the Internet. International NGOs played some role in igniting China's animal movement, but local groups are increasingly taking over.

China is estimated to be home to 168 million pet dogs.

In 2008, more than 40 animal activists in Beijing gathered to protest the reported cooking of live cats in the Guangdong province. Chinese activists prevented introduction of a bullfighting project in 2010 and rodeos in 2011. Activists have pre-empted a foie gras factory, ended live feeding in zoos, and rescued thousands of dogs and cats from being killed for meat.

A 2011 survey of about 6000 Chinese found that while about 2/3 of respondents had never previously heard of "animal welfare", 65.8% expressed at least partial support of animal-welfare laws (while 81.6% found them necessary in another question), and more than half said they were fully or partially willing to pay more for humane animal products. Two surveys back in 2002 and 2003 of Chinese college students also found that respectively 95% and 93.7% of them philosophically supported animal protection work, although only 48.2 and 51% of them were planning to actively participate.

Concerns for animal welfare as well as the environment coupled with historical Buddhist influence on Chinese society have led to increasing demand for vegetarian restaurants and plant-based meats in the country.

Xu Jingquan, secretary-general at the Beauty and Cosmetics Chamber of the All-China Federation of Industry and Commerce, reportedly said in 2013 that Chinese consumers thought less than others on issues such as animal testing for cosmetics. However, Mark Jones of the Born Free Foundation noted in the same year that Chinese tourists were among the most enthusiastic customers of cruelty-free products from Lush, amidst increasing widespread concern from online Chinese in the country on such issues.

Chinese animal welfare activists have also joined the efforts of Feline Guardians to stop the expansion of cat torture networks that emerged in China in the early 2020s. In 2026, an incident involving the killing of stray dog and her puppies was widely publicized outside of China but censored in the country amid calls for a law against animal cruelty.

== See also ==
- Chinese Animal Protection Network
- Dog meat in China
- Lychee and Dog Meat Festival
- Vegetarianism and veganism in China
- Wang Yan (activist)
