= "Jack Latiao" cat abuse incident =

2023 animal abuse case in China

"Jack Latiao" cat abuse incident (Chinese: 杰克辣条虐猫事件) refers to an incident in April 2023 where Xu Zhihui (Chinese: 徐志辉), a Chinese food vlogger known online as "Jack Latiao", stole a domestic cat, filmed, and disseminated cat abuse videos on the video platform Bilibili.

== Incident ==
On 27 April 2023, the Public Security Bureau of Funan County, Anhui Province reported that a citizen had reported their pet cow cat stolen. Police traced the thief to Xu Zhihui ("Jack Latiao") and discovered that he had abused the cat in a small grove near his home, tying it to a tree, beating it, clipping its claws, and burning it to death with fire. In the early morning of 27 April, he was taken to the Chengbei Police Station in Funan County and placed under administrative detention. Subsequently, he issued a public apology on Sina Weibo.

The incident led to the permanent ban of Jack Latiao's accounts on platforms such as Bilibili, and his honorary title of "Funan Good Person" was revoked as a result.

Afterwards, a large number of screenshots of cat abuse groups on Telegram circulated on the Chinese internet. A user named "Jack Latiao" was an administrator of one of these cat abuse groups. The methods of torture inside the group were extremely bloody and cruel, including placing live cats into blenders, skinning cats alive, and cutting open the abdomens of pregnant cats to remove kittens and forcing the mother cat to eat them. Some users in the group also claimed to trade hazardous materials such as sulfuric acid.

Actress Zhang Xinyu spoke out against animal cruelty on Sina Weibo, after which she was targeted with doxxing by cat abuse organizations, sparking public outrage.

In October 2023, Jack Latiao claimed on Weibo that the cat abuse incident was not committed by him and that the apology letter was posted by someone else. He claimed he had only forwarded the relevant cat abuse videos and stated that he was an animal lover, which drew widespread skepticism from netizens.

Following the incident, over 100,000 users on the Chinese stray animal rescue platform "Wozhua" community called on the state to take legal action to stop his acts of animal abuse.
