= Kurī =

Extinct Polynesian dog breed

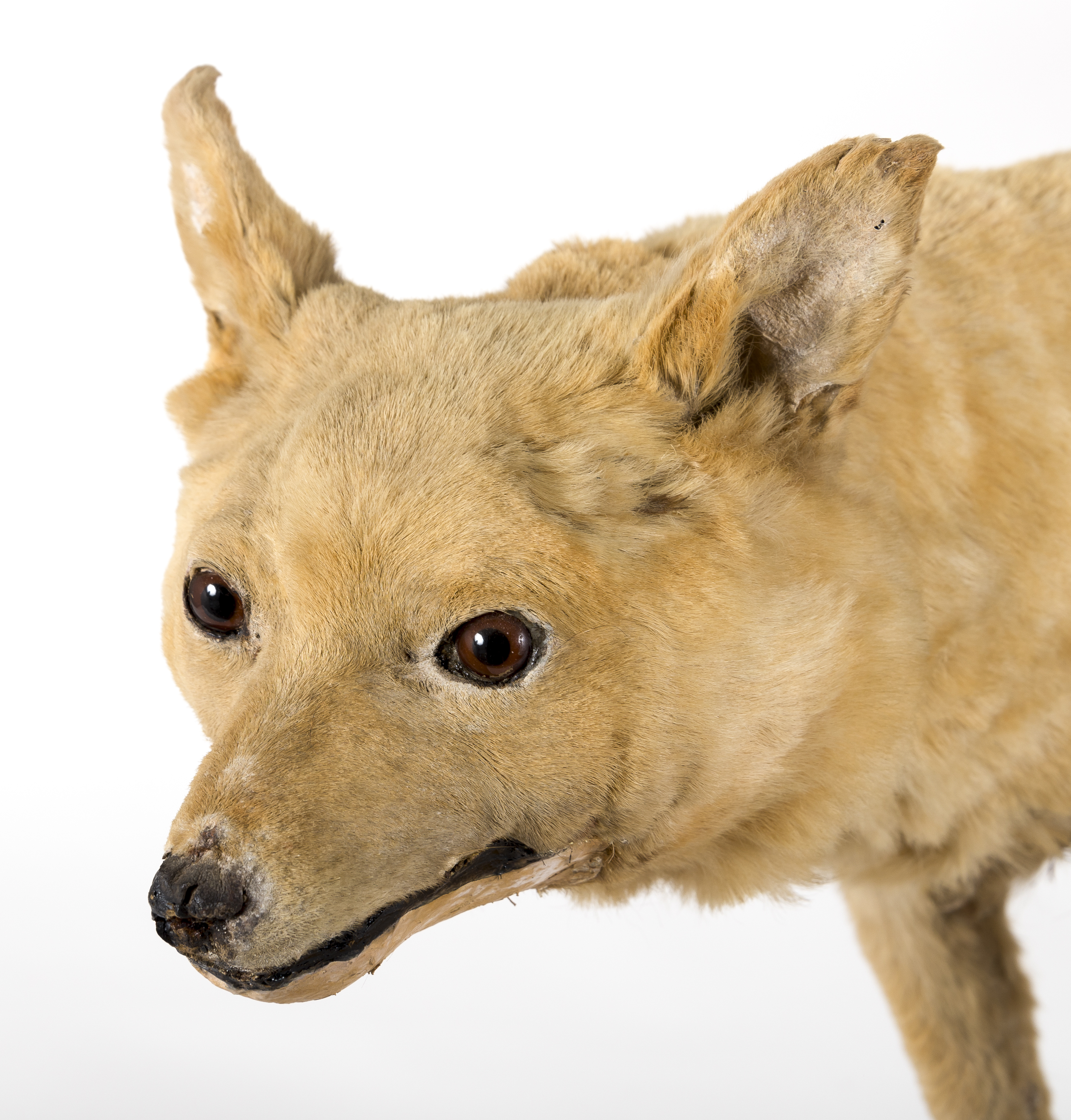
- Origin: New Zealand
- Breed status: Extinct

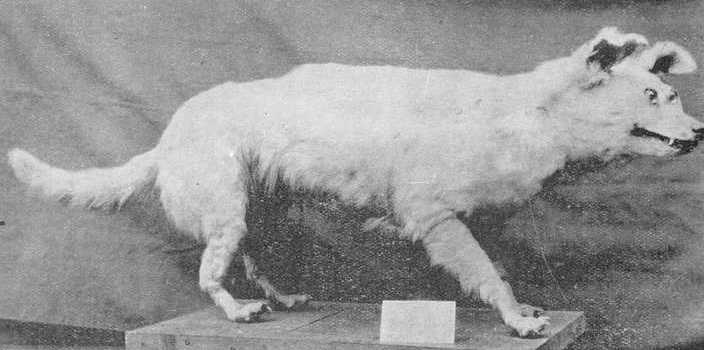
Kurī specimen, Museum of New Zealand Te Papa Tongarewa, 1924

The Kurī is an extinct breed of Polynesian Dog kept by Māori people. It was introduced to New Zealand by the Polynesian ancestors of the Māori during their migration from East Polynesia in the 13th century AD. According to Māori tradition, the demigod Māui transformed his brother-in-law Irawaru into the first dog.

== Description ==
Kurī were bushy-tailed, with short legs and powerful shoulders. Their coat colour ranged from yellowish brown to black, white, or spotted. Like other Polynesian dog breeds, they howled instead of barking.

== Use ==
Kurī were a source of food for Māori, and considered a delicacy. British explorer James Cook sampled kurī on his 1769 voyage and declared that it tasted almost as good as lamb.

Kurī were also used to hunt birds. In addition, Māori used their skins and fur to make dog-skin cloaks (kahu kurī), belts, weapon decorations and poi.

== Extinction ==
Kurī were seen widely across New Zealand during Cook's first voyage in 1769. The kurī became extinct in New Zealand in the 1860s, following the arrival of European settlers; the breed was unable to survive interbreeding with European dogs. The remains of the last known specimens, a female and her pup, are now in the collection of the Museum of New Zealand Te Papa Tongarewa.

== See also ==
- Hawaiian Poi Dog – breed of Polynesian dog introduced to Hawaii
- Marquesan Dog – extinct breed of Polynesian dog introduced to the Marquesas Islands
- Tahitian Dog - extinct breed of Polynesian dog introduced to Tahiti in the Society Islands
- Askal
- Taiwan dog
- Philippine forest dog
- Domesticated plants and animals of Austronesia
- List of dog breeds
- List of extinct dog breeds
