= Marquesan Dog =

Extinct Polynesian dog breed

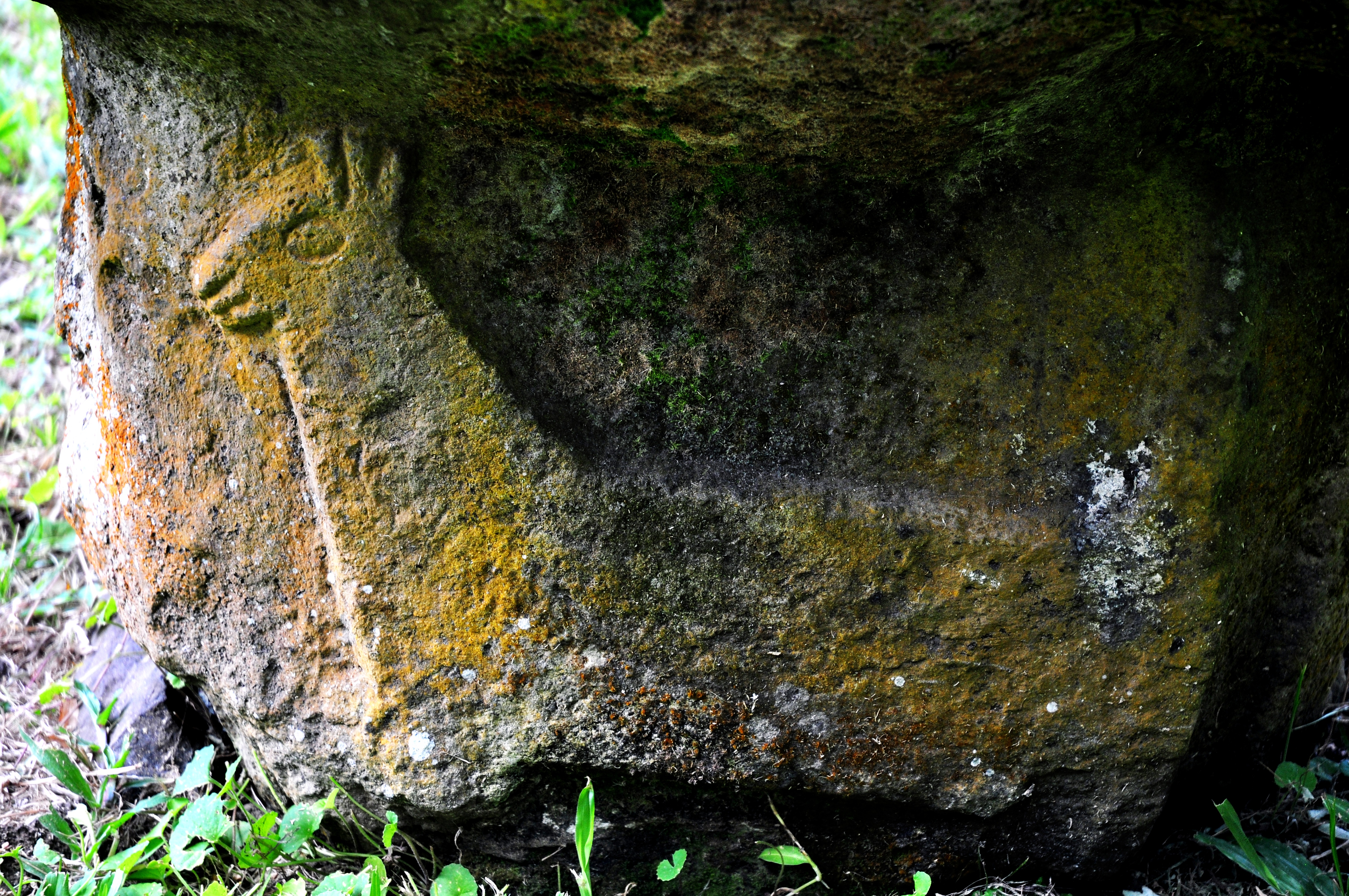
- Relief of Marquesan Dog on the Tiki Makiʻi Tauʻa Pepe, from the meʻae Iʻipona at Puamaʻu Village, Hiva Oa
- Other names: Marquesas Islands Dog
- Origin: Marquesas Islands (French Polynesia)
- Breed status: Extinct

The Marquesan Dog or Marquesas Islands Dog is an extinct breed of dog from the Marquesas Islands. Similar to other strains of Polynesian dogs, it was introduced to the Marquesas by the ancestors of the Polynesian people during their migrations. Serving as tribal totems and religious symbols, they were sometimes consumed as meat although less frequently than in other parts of the Pacific because of their scarcity. These native dogs are thought to have become extinct before the arrival of Europeans, who did not record their presence on the islands. Petroglyphic representations of dogs and the archaeological remains of dog bones and burials are the only evidence that the breed ever existed. Modern dog populations on the island are the descendants of foreign breeds later reintroduced in the 19th century as companions for European settlers.

== Linguistic ==
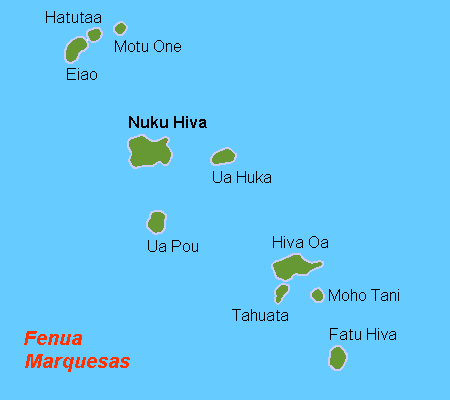
Map of the Marquesas Islands

There are two words in the Marquesan language for dog: peto, used in the Northern Marquesas, and nuhe, used in the Southern Marquesas. The former might have been an English loanword from pet or a Spanish loanword from perro (dog), although pero was an alternative for dog (kurī) in the related Māori language. According to another theory supporting its foreign origin, the name came from a New Haven dog named Pato left on Nuku Hiva by the American sea captain Edmund Fanning from 1798 to 1803. The South Marquesan Nuhe is unique in the Polynesian languages, but may have some connection to wanuhe, the word for dog in the Papuan language of the Brumer Islands. French Catholic missionary René-Ildefonse Dordillon listed two other forms: mohoʻio and mohokio in his 1904 dictionary Grammaire et dictionnaire de la langue des iles Marquises.

== History ==
Little is known about the Marquesan Dog. They were introduced to the Marquesan Islands by the original Polynesian settlers along with domesticated chickens, pigs, and the Polynesian rat. The dog is thought to have become extinct prior to the arrival of Spanish explorers in 1595, although some might have survived beyond this point. No European accounts were ever written about them. They were thought to be fairly rare and "never numerous in the islands" even before the arrival of Europeans. Unlike in other parts of Polynesia, dogs were not considered an important food source, although they were sometimes eaten as shown by the presence of cut marks on dog bones found in archaeological excavations. Due to their rarity, they were venerated by the Marquesans and were closely associated with the high chiefs and priestly classes.

Many petroglyphs or carved images of dogs were found near religious centers and chiefly residential areas indicating their venerated status and importance in the culture. A survey by American archaeologist Sidsel N. Millerstrom noted that a majority of dog petroglyphs have been found in the valleys of ʻAʻakapa, Haʻatuatua, and Hatiheu on the northern coast of Nuku Hiva, the meʻae Vaikivi on Ua Huka, and the meʻae Iʻipona and Eiaone Valley on Hiva Oa. Their regional distributions possibly reflected the role of dogs as symbols of tribal/clan loyalty and identity in the islands. They were totem animals associated with the Nakiʻi tribe.

== Characteristics ==
Petroglyphs often depict the Marquesan Dog in exaggerated forms. Millerstrom noted that these representations deviated from the typical characteristics of the Polynesian dog and wondered if they were meant to be realistic. She stated:

The Marquesan dogs' images show that the necks and the bodies are exaggerated in length. The tails are long and curved over the back while the ears and muzzle may be pointed, square or rounded. The legs are short and in one case from Hatiheu Valley the paws were pointed in the wrong direction...
The early post-contact dog is white or spotted, small to medium size, with pointed snout and ears, and a long tail. Could the Marquesans of the past have forgotten what the dog looked like or did it matter how they depicted the dog?

== Archaeological evidence ==
=== Stone carvings ===
German archaeologist Karl von den Steinen was the first European visitor to observe evidence of ancient dogs in the Marquesas in 1897–98. In his excavation of meʻae Iʻipona, a temple complex near the village of Puamaʻu on the northeastern coast of the island of Hiva Oa, he uncovered several stone tiki including two with zoomorphic (animal shaped) quadruped figures carved on them. During this period, the property and temple site was owned by Reverend James Kekela, a Hawaiian Protestant missionary, who von den Steinen befriended. He also relied on an elderly Marquesan named Pihua, who was the only living person who knew the names of the tiki at the site.

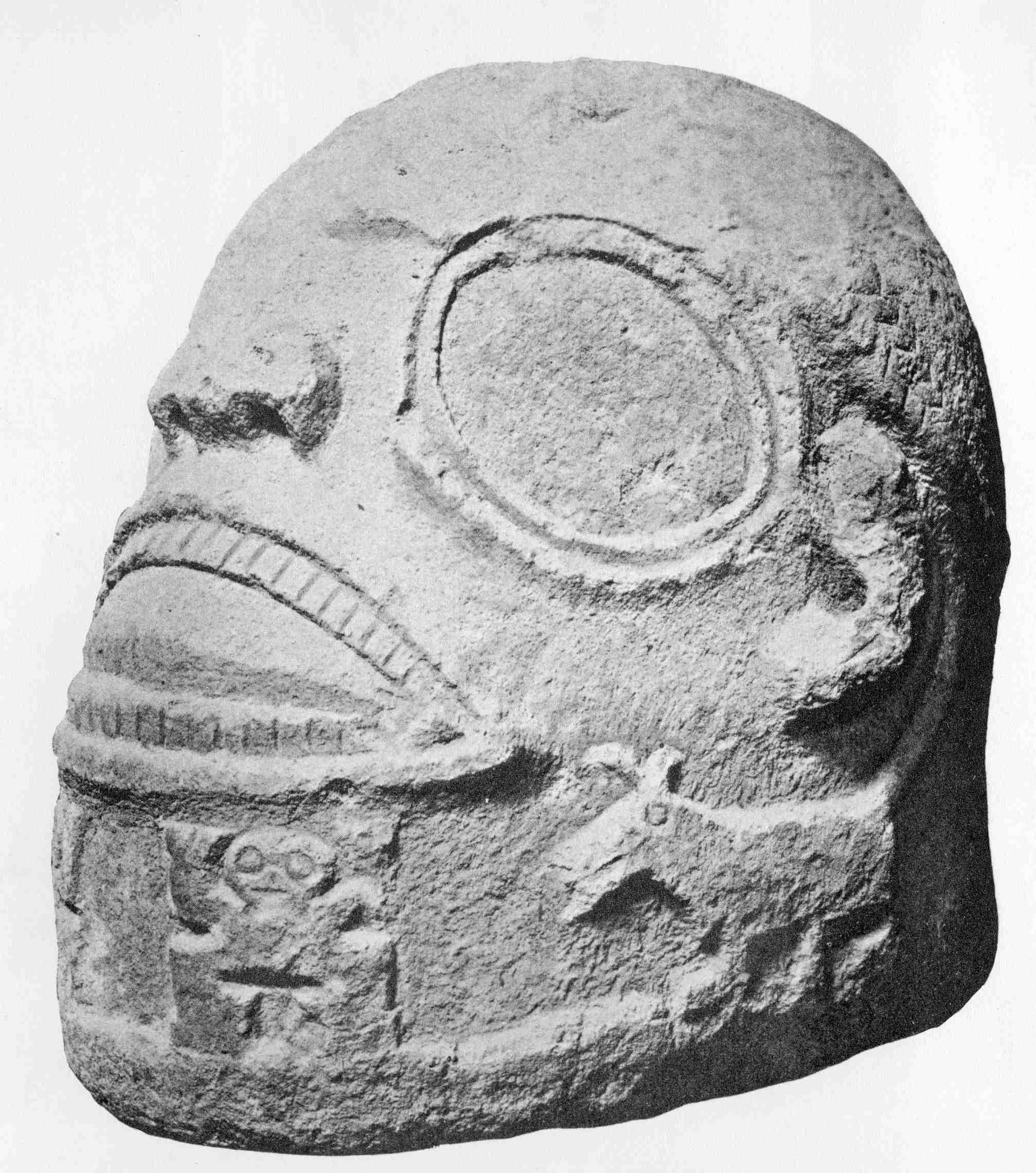
Opferkopf Manuiotaa, currently at the Ethnological Museum of Berlin

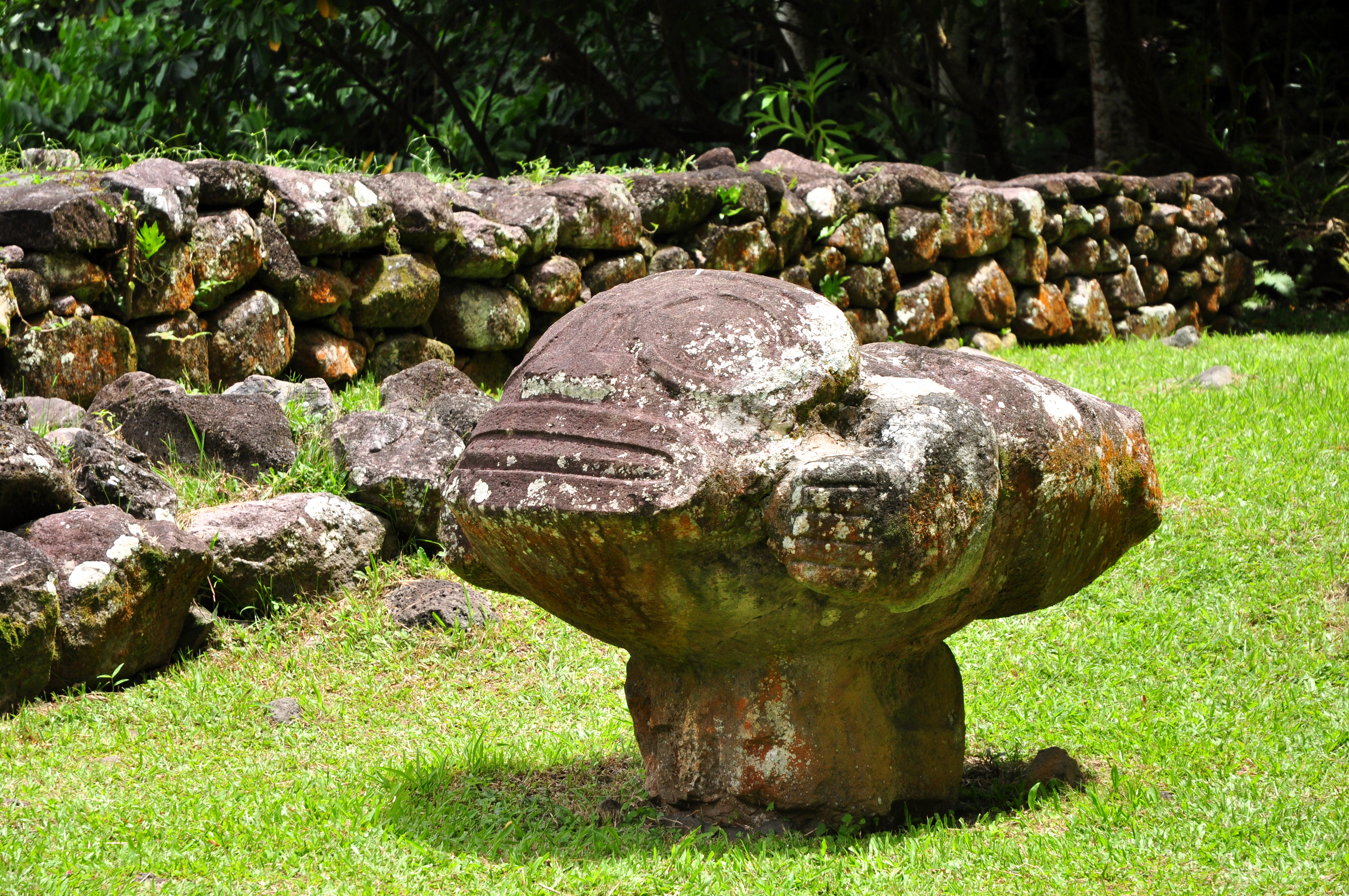
Tiki Makiʻi Tauʻa Pepe at Iʻipona

Measuring 82 centimetres (32 in) high, and 90 centimetres (35 in) in diameter, the first tiki was a megalithic stone head representing an unknown ʻupoko heʻaka "sacrificial victim". Von den Steinen named it Opferkopf Manuiotaa ("Sacrificial Head Manuiotaa"), after the famous 18th-century Marquesan sculptor Manuiotaʻa from the Nakiʻi tribe, who is believed to have carved both statues and many other tikis on the site. The head bore totem motifs of quadrupeds and little stick figures representing the Marquesans etua (gods) tattooed on each side of its mouth. He was informed that the quadrupeds could depict either dogs, rats or pigs. However, he concluded they were rats since at the time, dogs were believed to have been introduced by Europeans. He transported the head back to Germany where it is now displayed at the Ethnological Museum of Berlin.

The second statue was named Tiki Makiʻi Tauʻa Pepe after Manuiotaʻa's wife, known as Tauʻa Pepe (the "Butterfly Priestess"); she reportedly died in childbirth with Makiʻi meaning "writhing in agony". There are disagreements (Note: Both Karl von den Steinen and German ethnographer Arthur Baessler, who visited the site prior to him, described the statue in a reclining position. Thor Heyerdahl argued that it was originally in the prone position and was later toppled at the time Christianity was introduced to the islands.) if the statue should be set in the reclining position as it was discovered or the prone position as it is currently displayed. It is believed to represent a female in a prone position, head and arms reaching skyward, giving birth, although it has also been interpreted as a female deity bearing the Marquesan people on its back. Images of quadrupeds were carved as bas-reliefs on each side of the square base of this statue. This tiki remained in its original spot and is visible today at the site of Iʻipona. Only one of the dog carvings is discernible now; the other one has weathered away.

In 1956, Norwegian adventurer and ethnographer Thor Heyerdahl later claimed the reliefs on Tiki Makiʻi Tauʻa Pepe were llamas or pumas instead to bolster his theory that Polynesia was settled from South America. Later unidentified writers and rumors have insinuated that Heyerdahl deliberately altered and defaced the images in his process of restoring them. The modern consensus is that the carvings represent the extinct dog; they do not represent llamas, pumas or rats.

=== Bones and burials ===
In 1956, Robert Carl Suggs, with the American Museum of Natural History, led the first stratigraphical excavation of the islands and uncovered many dog bone fragments and one dog burial across a few sites on the island of Nuku Hiva. Between 1964 and 1965, American archaeologist Yosihiko H. Sinoto, with the Bishop Museum, discovered a drilled dog canine used as a pendant, one pre-molar and two dog burials in the sand dunes at Hane on the island of Ua Huka. In 1998, American archaeologist Barry Vladimir Rolett discovered dog bones in all levels of settlement at Hanamiai, on the island of Tahuata, indicating that the breed may have continued to exist on this island until the mid-19th century. Some of these bones had visible cut marks. In 2000, French archaeologist Pascal Sellier discovered three dog skeletons alongside several human burials at Manihina, Ua Huka; one dog was buried in a coffin.

Millerstrom summarized these earlier findings and personally analyzed many of the petroglyphs of dogs left by the prehistoric Polynesians in her 2003 paper "Facts and Fantasies: the Archaeology of the Marquesan Dog". She noted that further research needs to be done on the linguistic evidence tracing the movement of dogs within Oceania, the socio-economic roles of dog in Marquesan and Oceanian cultures, and a study into the morphology of the bones and dog burials found in the Marquesan archaeology sites.

== Reintroduction of dogs ==
Dogs of different breeds were later reintroduced by European settlers and visitors to the Marquesas. The first European dogs seen were those that accompanied Spanish explorers Álvaro de Mendaña de Neira and Pedro Fernandes de Queirós in 1595. While they were on Hiva Oa, the Marquesans attempted to steal one of the small dogs on their ships. Anthropologist Katharine Luomala noted that nothing suggested that these dogs were left by the Spanish. Possibly the first dogs reintroduced were those left by American ships during the early 1800s in the care of early beachcombers, missionaries and settlers who kept them as pets. One of the first reported cases was a New Haven dog named Pato, who had been "found guilty of sheep stealing about the year 1797 and was banished for the above crime". Around 1798, Captain Edmund Fanning left him on Nuku Hiva in the care of British missionary William Pascoe Crook who left him with a local ruler Keattonnue (i.e. King Cato), but on June 8, 1803, another American Captain Brinell recalled Pato and replaced him with two other dogs. During the Nuku Hiva Campaign of 1813, United States Naval Captain David Porter reported a few dogs on the island and observed the islanders were afraid of the two mastiffs on board his ship.

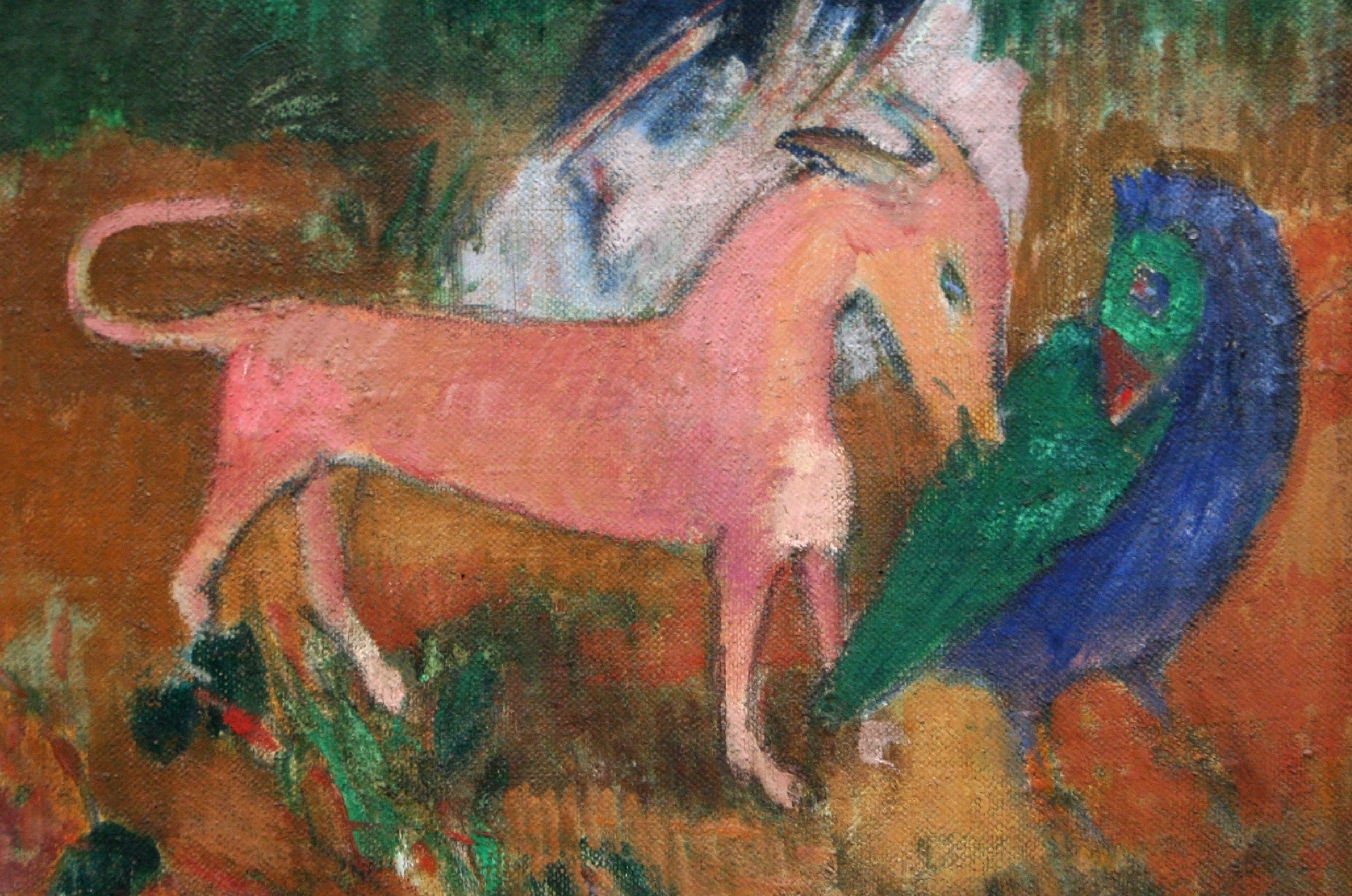
Paul Gauguin's 1902 probable depiction of the Marquesan swamphen being killed by a dog.

By the 1890s, English traveler Frederick William Christian noted the ideological conflict over dog meat consumption as island populations increased. He noted how the Marquesans living in the eastern valleys of the island of Hiva Oa had resumed eating baked dog meat "with delight" while the inhabitants of the western valleys "will barely touch [dog meat] even in times of famine". Christian also observed dog being eaten on Tahuata and Fatu Hiva. French artist Paul Gauguin depicted scenes including dogs in the Marquesas in several works while he lived on Hiva Oa. His 1902 painting Le sorcier d'Hiva-Oa ou Le Marquisien à la cape rouge possibly depicts a dog killing the now-extinct Marquesas swamphen (Porphyrio paepae).

In Herman Melville's 1846 semi-fictionalized work, (Note: Leon Howard noted Typee is "in fact, neither literal autobiography nor pure fiction". Melville "drew his material from his experiences, from his imagination, and from a variety of travel books when the memory of his experiences were inadequate".) Typee: A Peep at Polynesian Life, the narrator Tommo gives an unflattering account of dogs living in the valley of Tai Pī on Nuku Hiva:

I Think I must enlighten the reader a little about the natural history of the valley.

Whence, in the name of Count Buffon and Baron Cuvier, came those dogs that I saw in Typee? Dogs!—Big hairless rats rather; all with smooth, shining, speckled hides—fat sides, and very disagreeable faces. Whence could they have come? That they were not the indigenous production of the region, I am firmly convinced. Indeed they seemed aware of their being interlopers, looking fairly ashamed, and always trying to hide themselves in some dark corner. It was plain enough they did not feel at home in the vale—that they wished themselves well out of it, and back to the ugly country from which they must have come.

Scurvy curs! they were my abhorrence; I should have liked nothing better than to have been the death of every one of them. In fact, on one occasion, I intimated the propriety of a canine crusade to Mehevi; but the benevolent king would not consent to it. He heard me very patiently; but when I had finished, shook his head, and told me, in confidence, that they were "taboo".

== See also ==
- Hawaiian Poi Dog – breed of Polynesian dog introduced to Hawaii
- Kurī – extinct breed of Polynesian dog introduced to New Zealand
- Tahitian Dog - extinct breed of Polynesian dog introduced to Tahiti in the Society Islands
- Polynesian dog
- Askal
- Taiwan dog
- Philippine forest dog
- Domesticated plants and animals of Austronesia
- List of dog breeds
- List of extinct dog breeds
