= Tahitian Dog =

Extinct Polynesian dog breed

ʻŪrī Mā’ohi
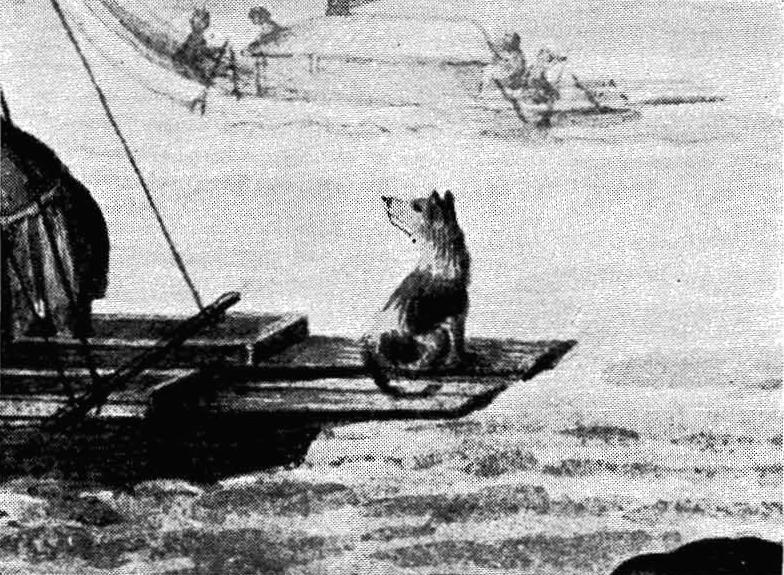
- Possible depiction of the Tahitian dog from the first voyage of James Cook, c. 1769–71. (Note: According to anthropologist Katharine Luomala, "This is the best picture I have found of what seems to be a native Polynesian dog: long muzzle, oblique eyes, prick ears, large head, stocky body, short legs, scraggly tail, patchy color, coarse hair, with only the alert look alien to descriptions." This depiction was either done by A. Buchan, S. Parkinson and J. F. Miller who were artists on the first voyage of Captain Cook.)
- Other names: South Sea Dog, Otaheite Dog, Tahitian Dog, Society Islands Dog, Poe Dog
- Origin: Tahiti, Society Islands (French Polynesia)
- Breed status: Extinct

The Tahitian Dog (Tahitian: ʻŪrī Mā’ohi, translated as 'native dog' (Note: Charles Hamilton Smith, who did not fully understand the Tahitian language, referred to this breed as the "Uri-Mahoi of Tahiti".)) is an extinct breed of dog from Tahiti and the Society Islands. Similar to other strains of Polynesian dogs, it was introduced to the Society Islands and Tahiti by the ancestors of the Tahitian (Mā’ohi) people during their migrations to Polynesia.

They were an essential part of traditional Tahitian society; their meat was included in Tahitian cuisine and other parts of the dog were used to make tools and ornamental clothing. Dogs were fed a vegetarian diet and served during feasts as a delicacy. European explorers were the first outsiders to observe and record their existence, and they were served to early explorers including Captain James Cook. The Tahitian Dog disappeared as a distinct breed after the introduction of foreign European dogs.

== History ==
The Tahitian Dog, known as the ʻŪrī Mā’ohi in the Tahitian language, was introduced to Tahiti and the Society Islands (in modern French Polynesia) by the ancestors of the Tahitian (Mā’ohi) people during their migrations to Polynesia. They were closely related to the Hawaiian Poi Dog and the New Zealand Kurī; the latter is believed to be a descendant of the breed. Similar breeds of Polynesian dogs were brought alongside pigs and chickens when the people settled the islands of Polynesia. Genetic studies indicate that the New Zealand Kuri/dog is derived from Indonesian dogs, and therefore by inference it is likely that Society island dogs are of the same origin. The Marquesan Dog became extinct in the neighboring Marquesas Islands before 1595. Even though dogs were virtually absent from Western Polynesia, they were recognized when European explorers later brought them as items of trade, indicating a universal cultural recognition of the dog in the many islands.

Dogs were tied with strings around the belly and kept in the house, where they were raised as a food source alongside domesticated pigs. Seen as a delicacy, they were served during feasts and to the high chiefs. Dogs were less abundant than pigs in the islands, possibly because they were killed while they were young. European visitors noticed that native women, especially those who lost their own children, would often breastfeed puppies and small pigs.

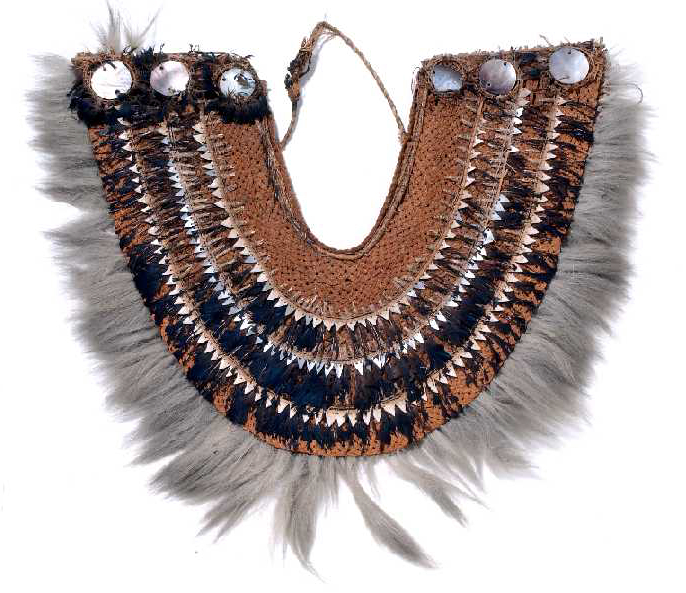
The taumi, a traditional breast ornament, fringed with dog hair from the Tuamotus, James Cook Collection: Australian Museum

They were an essential part of traditional Tahitian society. Dog teeth were fashioned into fishhooks and dog bones were made into weapons and implements. They also used dog hair, especially the long tail hairs of the Tuamotuan varieties of dogs, to decorate the fringes of the taumi – a traditional breast ornament often called a gorget – which were worn by priests and high chiefs. The Tuamotuan breed were described as similar to their Tahitian counterparts distinguishable by their longer hair. Historian Margaret Titcomb noted that Tuamotuan varieties may not have been a separate breed that developed in isolation, arguing that the people of the Tuamotus could have eaten their short haired varieties and kept their longer haired dogs for exports to the Society Islands.

The Tahitian Dog became extinct in the Society Islands some time after the arrival of European settlers due to the introduction of, and interbreeding with, European dog breeds. By 1834, British traveler Frederick Debell Bennett noted: "Amongst the Society Islands, the aboriginal dog, which was formerly eaten as a delicacy by the natives, is now extinct, or merged into mongrel breeds by propagation with many exotic varieties." Most other breeds of Polynesian dogs also became extinct due to interbreeding with foreign dogs by the beginning of the 20th century.

This breed and other Polynesian dogs were sometimes considered a distinct species by 18th century naturalists and scientists, and received scientific names such as Canis domesticus, indicus taitiensis (1778) by Georg Forster, Canis familiaris villaticus, meridionalis (1817) by F. L. Walther, Canis otahitensis (1836) or Canis familiaris orthotus otahitensis (1836) by Heinrich Gottlieb Ludwig Reichenbach, Canis pacificus (1845) by Charles Hamilton Smith, and Canis familiaris otahitensis (1859) by Christoph Gottfried Andreas Giebel. Luomala noted that the "source material of taxonomists has been derived, often at second- and third-hand, from impressionistic descriptions by members of the expeditions of Captain Cook and other eighteenth-century explorers, none of whom give a single measurement or preserved a specimen for scientific study".

== Characteristics ==
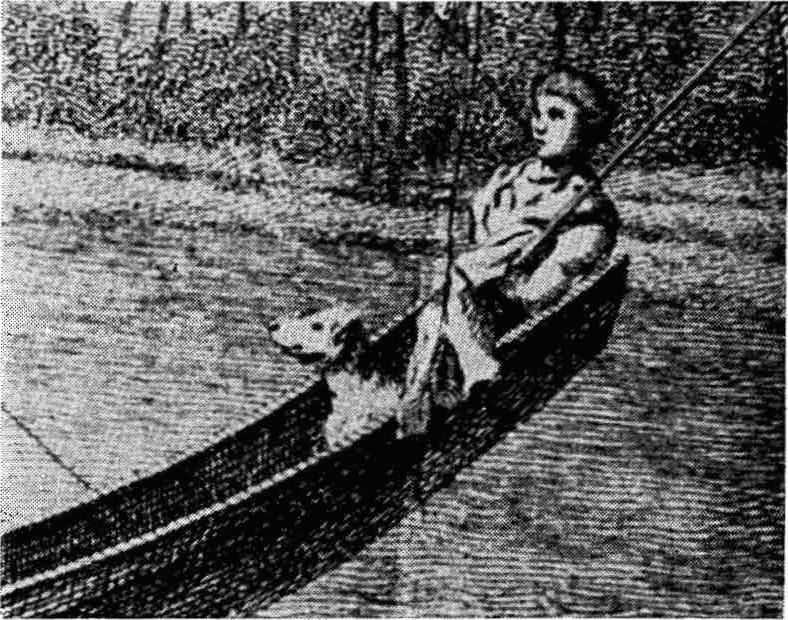
A dog sitting below a boy in an outrigger canoe from Sydney Parkinson's A view of the island of Otaheite with several vessels of that island, c. 1773.

The Tahitian Dogs were described as having a small or medium build, resembling terriers or crooked-legged dachshund in size. Their coats were usually brown, white or rust-yellow with smooth hairs. They had broad heads, small eyes, long backs, sharp-pointed muzzles and erect ears. They were described as lazy, shy, and not ferocious, but as having notoriously bad dispositions. They seldom barked but sometimes howled. Often they are lumped together with the Hawaiian Poi Dog by 19th-century taxonomists because of their similar appearance and diet, in contrast to the Kurī, which was much larger in size due to their higher protein diet.

Their diet included breadfruits, coconuts, yams, poi made from taro and sometimes fish. This soft vegetarian diet caused the dogs to develop round skulls and a small stature.

German naturalist Georg Forster wrote generally about the Polynesian dogs, but more specifically in response to the ones he saw in the Society Islands during a visit to Huahine in September 1773:

The dogs of all these islands were short, and their sizes vary from that of a lap-dog to the largest spaniel. Their head is broad, the snout pointed, the eyes very small, the ears upright, and their hair rather long, lank, hard, and of different colours, but most commonly white and brown. They seldom if ever barked, but howled sometimes, and were shy of strangers to a degree of aversion.

== European encounters ==
Tahitian Dogs were offered and served by high ranking chiefs to the early European explorers who visited the islands. In 1767, British explorer Samuel Wallis observed the breed for the first time in Tahiti. They were bounded "with their fore-legs tied over their heads" and attempted to run away in an erect position; Wallis initially took them for "some strange animal". When trading with natives, Wallis' men accepted the offerings of hogs and cloth but untied the dogs and turned them loose, an act that confused the Tahitians.

On his first voyage, Captain James Cook and his crew developed a taste for the dog during a three-month stay in the Society Islands in 1769. Cook wrote an account of the first time his men tried dog meat and the traditional process of preparing the meat:

As the most effectual means to bring about a reconciliation, she [high chiefess Oberea] presented us with a hog, and several other things, among which was a dog. We had lately learnt, that these animals were esteemed by the Indians as more delicate food than their pork; and upon this occasion we determined to try the experiment; the dog, which was very fat, we consigned over to Tupia, who undertook to perform the double office of butcher and cook. He killed him by holding his hands close over his mouth and nose, an operation which continued above a quarter of an hour. While this was doing, a hole was made in the ground about a foot deep, in which a fire was kindled, and some small stones placed in layers alternately with the wood to heat; the dog was then singed, by holding him over the fire, and, by scraping him with a shell, the hair taken off as clean as if he had been scalded in hot water: he was then cut up with the same instrument, and his entrails being taken out, were sent to the sea, where being carefully washed, they were put into cocoa-nut shells, with what blood had come from the body; when the hole was sufficiently heated, the fire was taken out, and some of the stones, which were not so hot as to discolour any thing that they touched, being placed at the bottom, were covered with green leaves, the dog, with the entrails, was then placed upon the leaves, and other leaves being laid upon them, the whole was covered with the rest of the hot stones, and the mouth of the hole close stopped with mould: in somewhat less than four hours it was again opened, and the dog taken out excellently baked, and we all agreed that he made a very good dish. The dogs which are here bred to be eaten, taste no animal food, but are kept wholly upon bread-fruit, cocoa-nuts, yams, and other vegetables of the like kind; all the flesh and fish eaten by the inhabitants is dressed in the same way.

In his journal, Cook noted, "For tame Animals they have Hogs, Fowls, and Dogs, the latter of which we learned to Eat from them, and few were there of us but what allow'd that a South Sea dog was next to an English lamb". Artist Sydney Parkinson reported that Captain Cook, Banks and Solander when in Tahiti said roasted dog was 'the sweetest meat they ever tasted' although Parkinson stated he abhorred the 'disagreeable smell' which put them off, such that they could not be prevailed upon to eat it. Naturalist Joseph Banks made a similar report. (Note: Nor were these explorers the last to eat dog. The Lewis and Clark expedition was so feted. Dog is not a normal staple of Native American diets, but it can be found in the Pacific and Columbian Basin.)

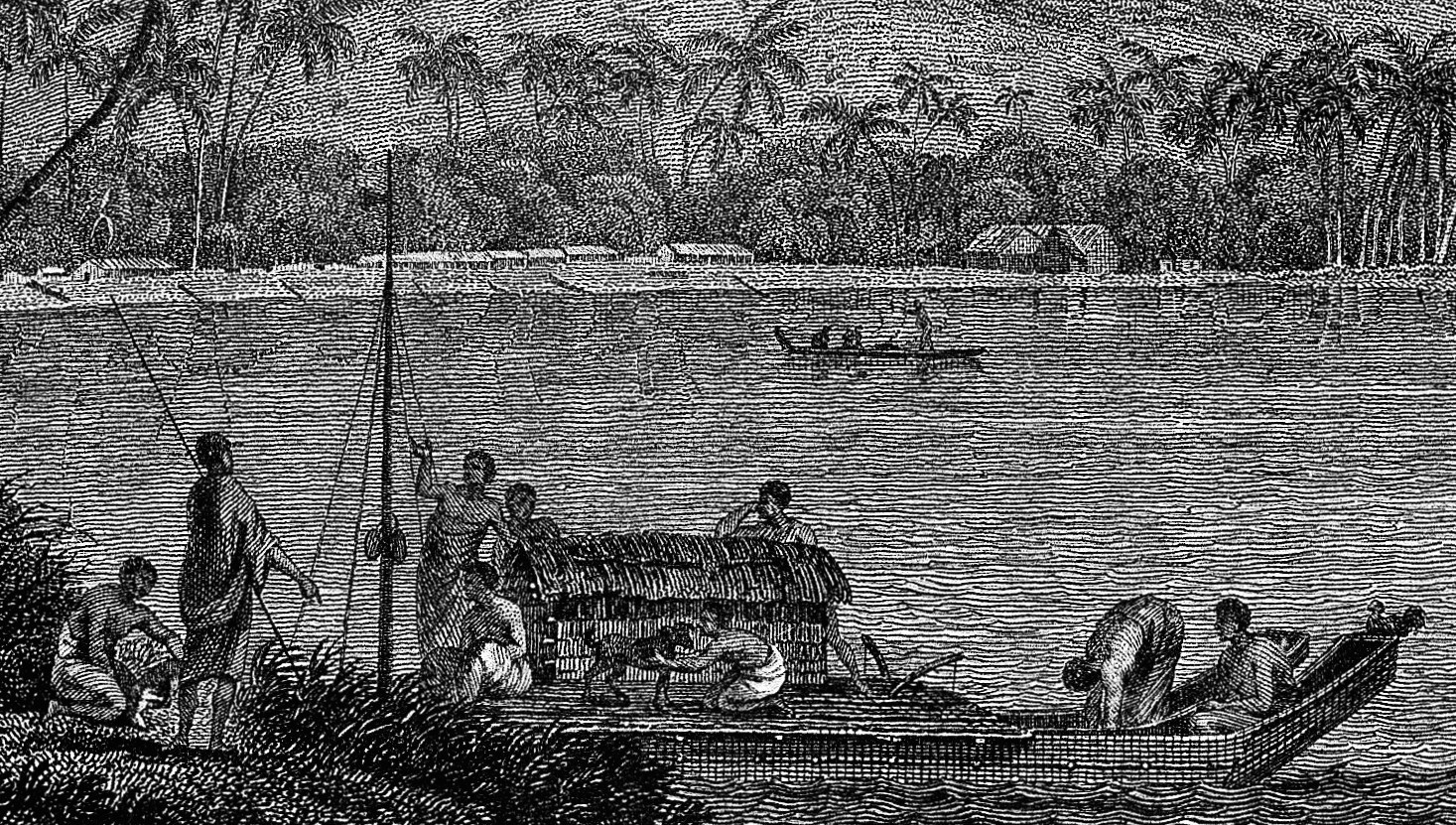
Dog in a canoe depicted in John Webber's A view of Huaheine, from the Third voyage of James Cook

During Cook's second voyage, Forster brought two Tahitian Dogs aboard the ship to take home to England. They were tested with arrow poison at Malakula by having their legs opened with a lancet and inserted with the substance; both dogs recovered, though one later died from eating poisonous fish. However, the fate of the other dog and their remains is unknown.

== Depictions in European art ==
Western artists often infused Euro-American characteristics in their depictions of the dogs of Polynesia and possibly many actually depicted the pet dogs kept on European ships rather than native breeds. This resulted in few accurate depictions of the dogs surviving. A few works likely depicting the aboriginal dog breed done by Parkinson, Webber, Alexander Buchan and John Frederick Miller were compiled by American anthropologist Katharine Luomala, including the two images above.

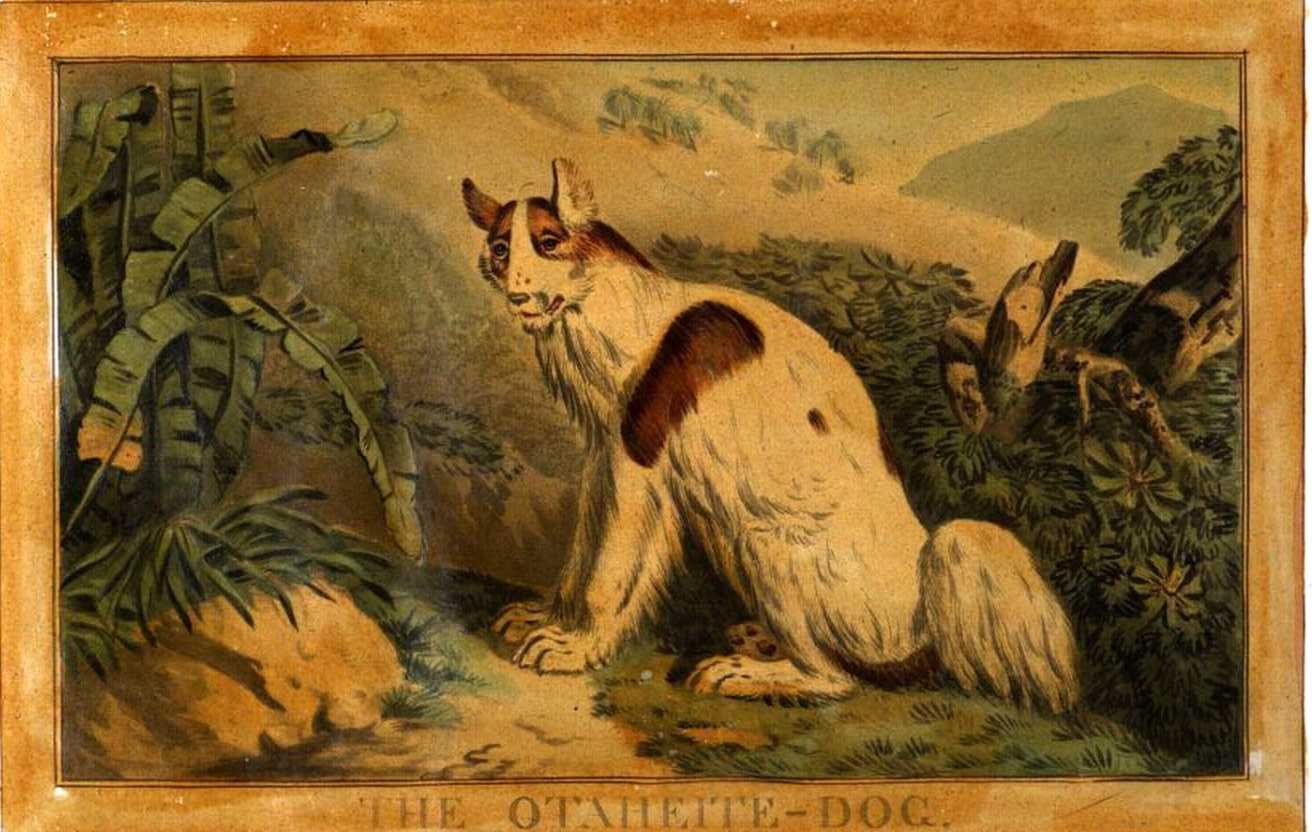
Otaheite Dog, aquatint engraving by Charles Catton the younger, 1788

In 1788, Charles Catton the younger, who did not accompany any of voyages, depicted an aquatint engraving of an "Otaheite Dog" in his book Animals Drawn from Nature and Engraved in Aqua-tinta. Based on its appearance and description, it may actually been a kurī instead.

Artist Paul Gauguin depicted dogs in Tahiti and the Marquesas—although it is unclear whether they were the prototypical Polynesian Dog—in several works, including I raro te oviri (I) (Under the Pandanus I) (1891) and Arearea (Joyfulness) 1892. The prominence in his paintings of these collarless free range dogs has been the subject of much speculation as to their symbolic or metaphorical meaning.

== Archaeology ==
Archaeologic records indicate that dogs were present in the Society Islands from the period of initial settlement up to the point of European contact. Modern digs in Tahiti and the other Society Islands have uncovered few surviving remains of the Tahitian Dog. In 1960, a few canine teeth were uncovered at Ana Paia shelter, on Mo'orea. In 1962, a complete skull, limbs, and vertebrae were discovered at a marae site on Mo'orea along with a jawbone at another site on the same island. In 1973, American archaeologists Yosihiko H. Sinoto and Patrick C. McCoy discovered bone fragments of domesticated dogs and pigs in the early settlements of Vaiato'oia (near Fa'ahia) on the island of Huahine.

== See also ==
- Kurī – extinct breed of Polynesian dog introduced to New Zealand
- Marquesan Dog – extinct breed of Polynesian dog introduced to the Marquesas Islands
- Hawaiian Poi Dog - an extinct breed of Polynesian dog introduced to Hawaiʻi
- Polynesian dog
- Askal
- Taiwan dog
- Philippine forest dog
- Domesticated plants and animals of Austronesia
- List of dog breeds
- List of extinct dog breeds
- Dog meat
