= Hawaiian Poi Dog =

Extinct pariah dog breed

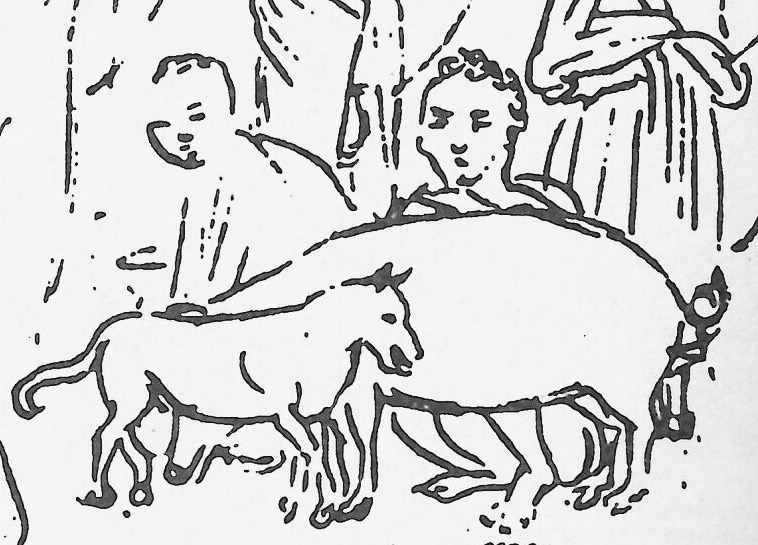
- Hawaiian Poi Dog (left) in sketch by Louis Choris, c. 1816–17
- Other names: ʻĪlio, ʻĪlio mākuʻe, Hawaiian Dog
- Origin: Ancient Hawaii
- Breed status: Extinct

The Hawaiian Poi Dog (Hawaiian: ʻīlio or ʻīlio mākuʻe) is an extinct breed of pariah dog from Hawaiʻi which was used by Native Hawaiians as a spiritual protector of children and as a source of food.

== History ==
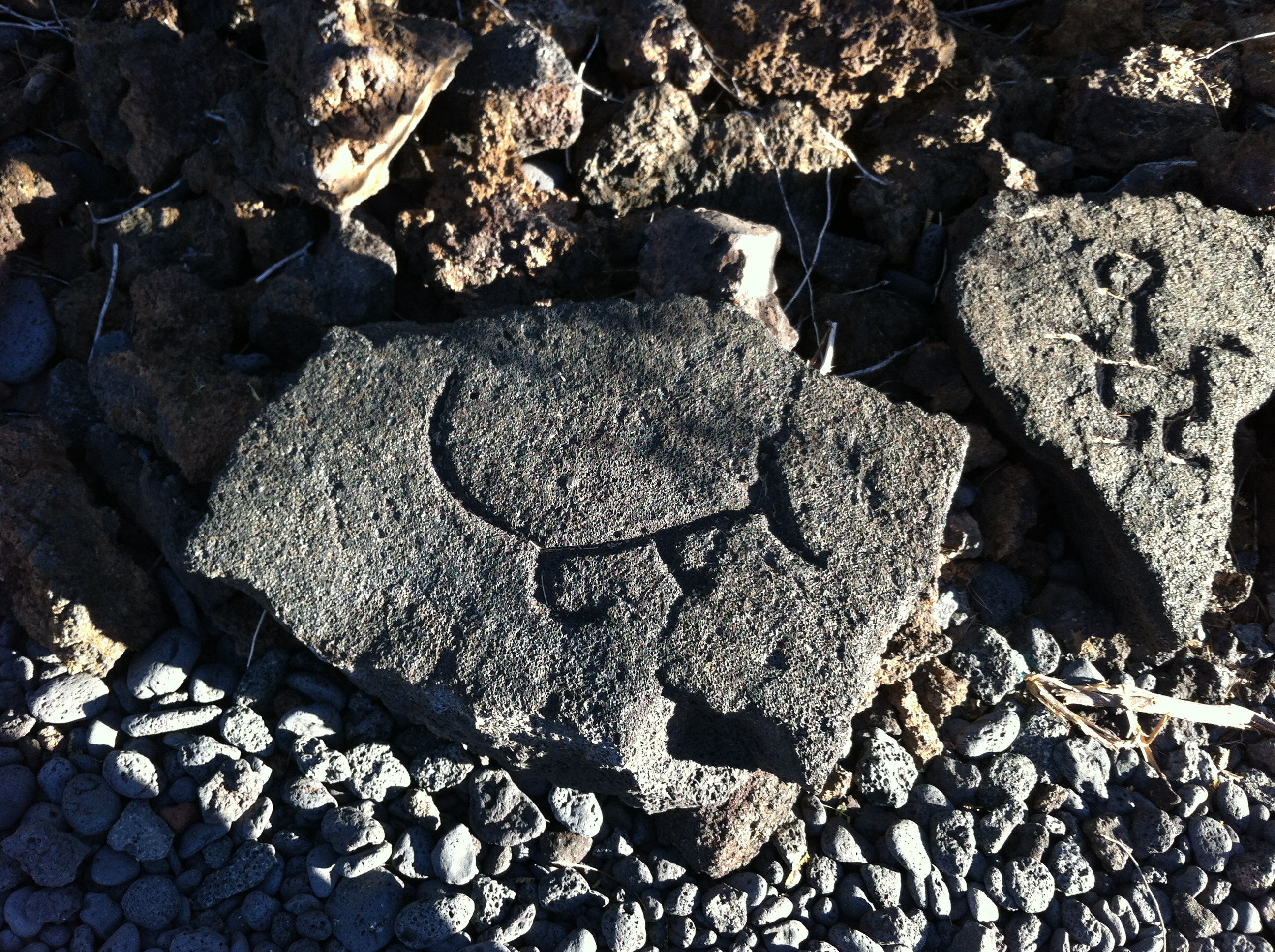
Ancient Hawaiian petroglyphic depiction of a native dog, Hawaii Island

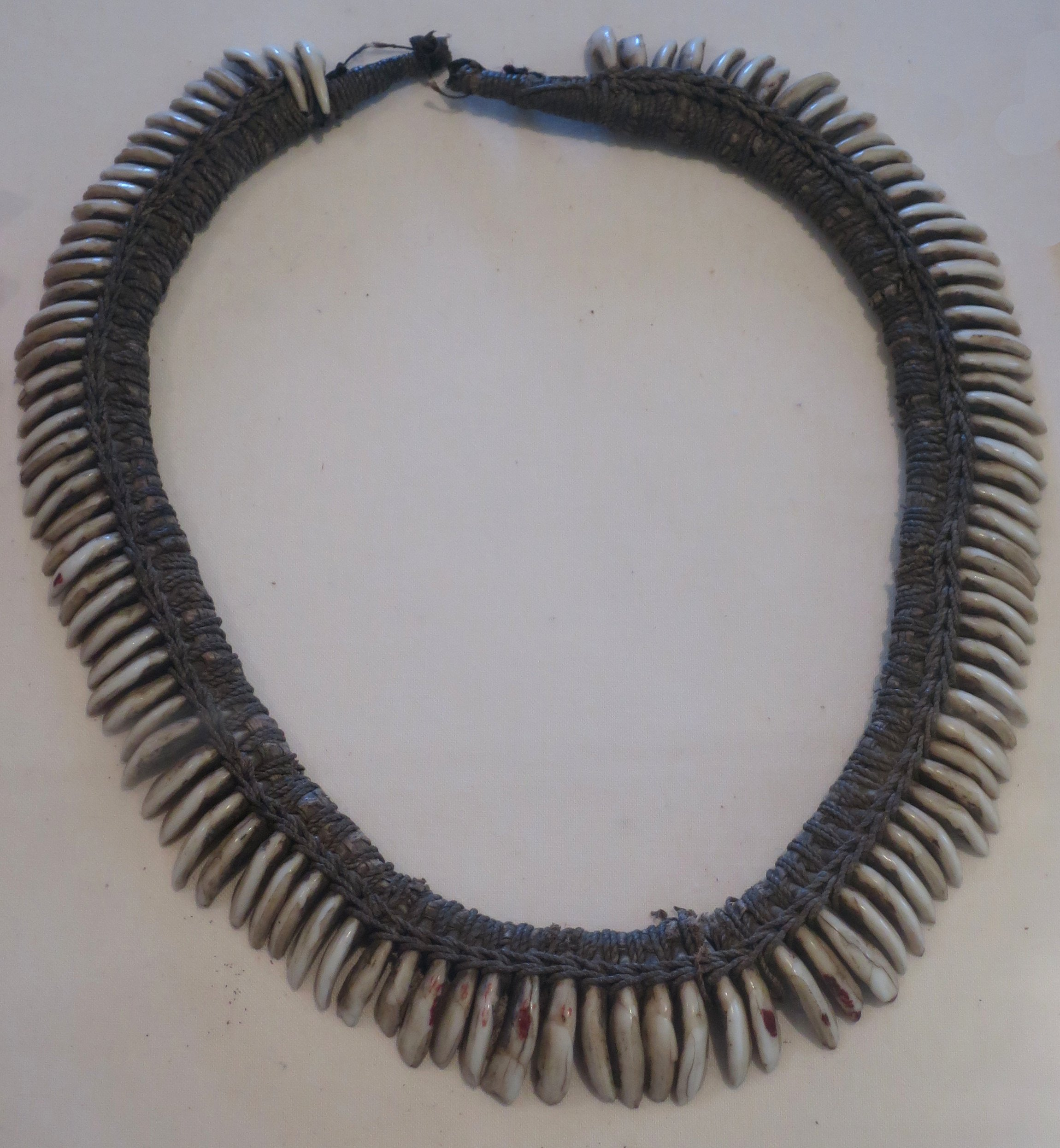
A lei niho ʻīlio made from the teeth of the poi dog and olona fiber, Bailey House Museum

The original Hawaiian poi dogs were descended from the Polynesian Dogs brought to the Hawaiian Islands by the Polynesian people. Genetic studies on the New Zealand Kurī dog indicate that the origin of this dog (and therefore probably the Hawaiian poi dog) to be Indonesia. Referred as the ʻīlio in the Hawaiian language, the modern name of this breed is derived from poi, a Hawaiian staple food made from mashed and cooked kalo (or taro) root. The poi mash was used to fatten-up the dogs for use as livestock, as any meat obtained (from either land or sea) was deemed too valuable to be used simply as dog food. Since the Hawaiian archipelago did not have large, terrestrial mammals, other than feral hogs (which also likely arrived with the Polynesians), poi dogs were not particularly desired or needed for hunting. The dogs were never deliberately or specifically bred to a standard, but human selective breeding and natural selection still came-into play.

European explorers, like Captain Cook, encountered "pot-bellied, short-legged" poi dogs that freely associated with the kept hogs in the villages. The dogs were said to have had very short coats, in a multitude of colors; brown poi dogs were regarded as distinct, enough to warrant a special name. The dogs' heads also had, peculiarly, a "flattened" appearance, a trait which is sometimes ascribed to the diet of the dogs, albeit in some unspecified way (possibly nutritionally-related); considering poi does not require substantial chewing to consume, the dogs may have gradually devolved the need to maintain strong temporalis muscles, as a reduced temporal fossa will cause a dog's head to appear "flattened". Poi dogs were thus considered rather dim-witted and sluggish—most of them, seemingly, lacked acute senses and would neither make for good hunting dogs nor be of much practical use on the islands. Nonetheless, they were said to be strong-willed and difficult to train.

The poi dog was a two-purpose breed; it was bred and used for sustenance on the islands and as a lucky charm. Unsuited for much else, the breed declined into extinction as the islanders' beliefs were forgotten and eating dog meat became unfashionable. Over time, free-ranging and feral dogs, brought by European and American settlers, interbred with the local poi dogs; by the early 20th century, at the latest, the breed had disappeared as a distinct entity.

== Surviving depictions ==
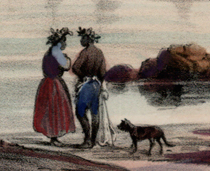
Vue de Honolulu. lles Sandwich, drawing by Barthélémy Lauvergne, c. 1836. Detail crop shows a spotted dog with prick ears and a long tail.

No surviving artwork or photograph from Hawaiian history are authentically attributed as poi dogs. Often Western artists infused Euro-American characteristics in their 18th-century depictions of the dogs of Polynesia and by the 19th century, the dogs being depicted were of foreign breeds. The lack of details has led historians to guess at what works may be realistic depictions of the breed based on the physical characteristics.

Writers Katharine Luomala and Margaret Titcomb both agreed an unfinished line drawing, dated to c. 1816–17, by French artist Louis Choris, who was part of the exploring expedition of Otto von Kotzebue, may show one of the dogs in center which may resemble the extinct breed. Luomala also claims French artist Barthélémy Lauvergne possibly captured a dog with the same traits in his colored drawing of Honolulu Harbor in 1836.

Ancient Hawaiian petroglyphs depict simplified representations of the dogs. They often show the curly tails and pointed ears characteristic of the breed.

== Breeding program ==
A female from the Honolulu Zoo program, c. 1969

In 1967, Jack L. Throp, director of the Honolulu Zoo, attempted to bring back the breed through selective breeding of local dogs based on morphological characteristics. The project studied 18th- and 19th-century descriptions of the dog before 1825 and also the surviving skeletal remains of the ancient breed to set a standard. From this, they selected local dogs in Hawaii, who were then bred for the desired traits. By the third generation from the original dogs selected in the program, a female was born with the desired appearance of the ancient breed. Commenting in 1969, Throp noted:

The Honolulu Zoo undertook a project in 1967 to re-create the Polynesian dog. The purpose behind such a project is to tell the story of the animal life of the Hawaiian Islands in a living Hawaiian exhibit. The dog is an important part of the Polynesians' contribution to this story.

The program is thought to have discontinued shortly afterward. In 1976, the crews on the Hōkūleʻa on their expedition to recreate the historical Polynesian voyage between Hawaii and Tahiti brought along a dog from this program, which they named Hoku.

== Usage ==
Today, the term "poi dog" is most often used to refer to mutts or mixed breed dogs, but also attribute specific characteristics to poi dogs, including the ability to eat anything, a strong will, and a unique appearance composed of different breeds. The term "poi dog" is also colloquially used to describe people of mixed heritage, although the more common term in use is hapa.

== See also ==
- Kurī – extinct breed of Polynesian dog introduced to New Zealand by Māori
- Marquesan Dog – extinct breed of Polynesian dog introduced to the Marquesas Islands
- Tahitian Dog – extinct breed of Polynesian dog introduced to Tahiti in the Society Islands
- Polynesian dog
- Askal
- Taiwan dog
- Philippine forest dog
- Domesticated plants and animals of Austronesia
- List of dog breeds
- List of extinct dog breeds

== Bibliography ==
- Coren, Stanley (2006). The Intelligence of Dogs: A Guide to the Thoughts, Emotions, and Inner Lives of Our Canine Companions. New York: Free Press. ISBN 978-0-7432-8087-7. OCLC 61461866.
- Haas, Michael (2011). Barack Obama, The Aloha Zen President: How a Son of the 50th State May Revitalize America Based on 12 Multicultural Principles. Santa Barbara, CA: Praeger. ISBN 978-0-313-39403-4. OCLC 658117495.
- Hemmer, Helmut (1990). Domestication: The Decline of Environmental Appreciation. Translated by Neil Beckhaus. Cambridge: Cambridge University Press. ISBN 978-0-521-34178-3.
- Lewis, David (1978). The Voyaging Stars: Secrets of the Pacific Island Navigators. Sydney: Collins. ISBN 978-0-00-216404-7. OCLC 4722789.
- Luomala, Katharine (July 1960a). "A History of the Binomial Classification of the Polynesian Native Dog" (PDF). Pacific Science. 14 (13). Honolulu: Pacific Science Association: 193–223. hdl:10125/8347. OCLC 78130351.
- Luomala, Katharine (April 1962). "Additional Eighteenth-Century Sketches of the Polynesian Native Dog, Including the Maori" (PDF). Pacific Science. 16 (2). Honolulu: Pacific Science Association: 170–180. hdl:10125/5950. OCLC 16324444.
- Reinecke, John E.; Tsuzaki, Stanley M. (Winter 1967). "Hawaiian Loanwords in Hawaiian English of the 1930s". Oceanic Linguistics. 6 (2). Honolulu: University of Hawaii Press: 80–115. doi:10.2307/3622760. JSTOR 3622760. OCLC 883144524.
- Sharma, Dinesh (2011). Barack Obama in Hawai'i and Indonesia: The Making of a Global President. Santa Barbara, CA: Praeger. ISBN 978-0-313-38533-9. OCLC 548555647.
- Titcomb, Margaret; Pukui, Mary Kawena (1969). Dog and Man in the Ancient Pacific, with Special Attention to Hawaii. Vol. 59. Honolulu: Bernice P. Bishop Museum Special Publications. OCLC 925631874.
- Williams, Carys (2015). For the Love of Dog – A Discussion on Dog Domestication with an Ethnographic Focus on the Islands of the South Pacific. Oxford: University of Oxford.
