= Karl von den Steinen =

German explorer

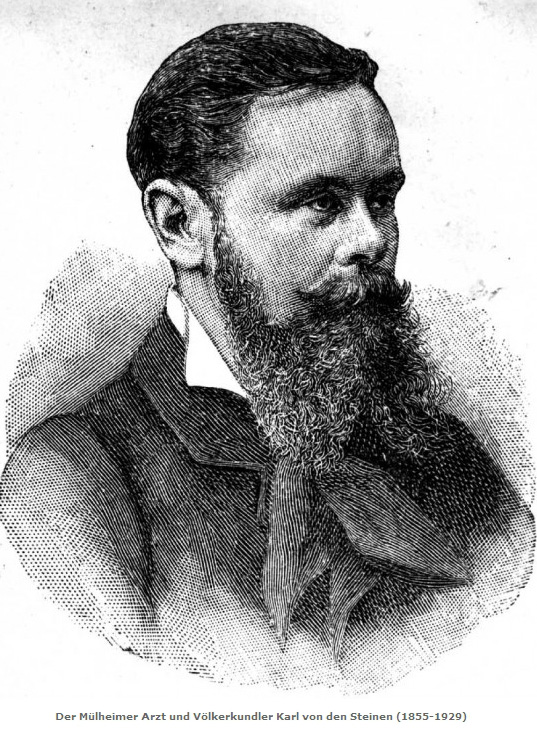
- Karl von den Steinen (Stadtarchiv Mülheim).
- Born: Karl von den Steinen; 7 March 1855; Mülheim, Kingdom of Prussia, German Confederation
- Died: 4 November 1929 (aged 74); Kronberg im Taunus, Free State of Prussia, Germany

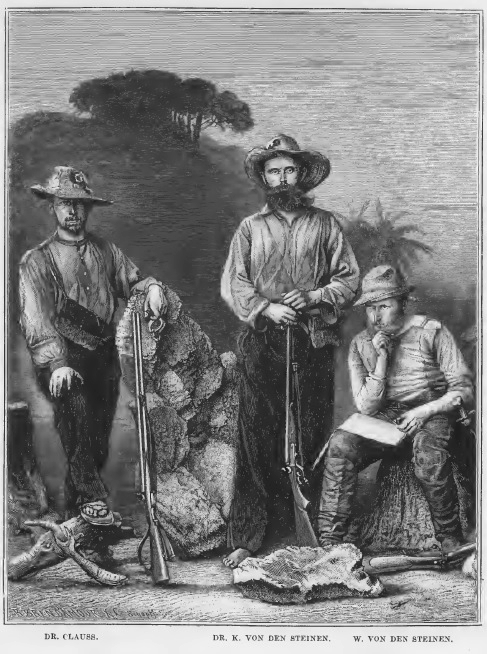
Karl von den Steinen (center) and his companions on the first expedition in the Xingú region.

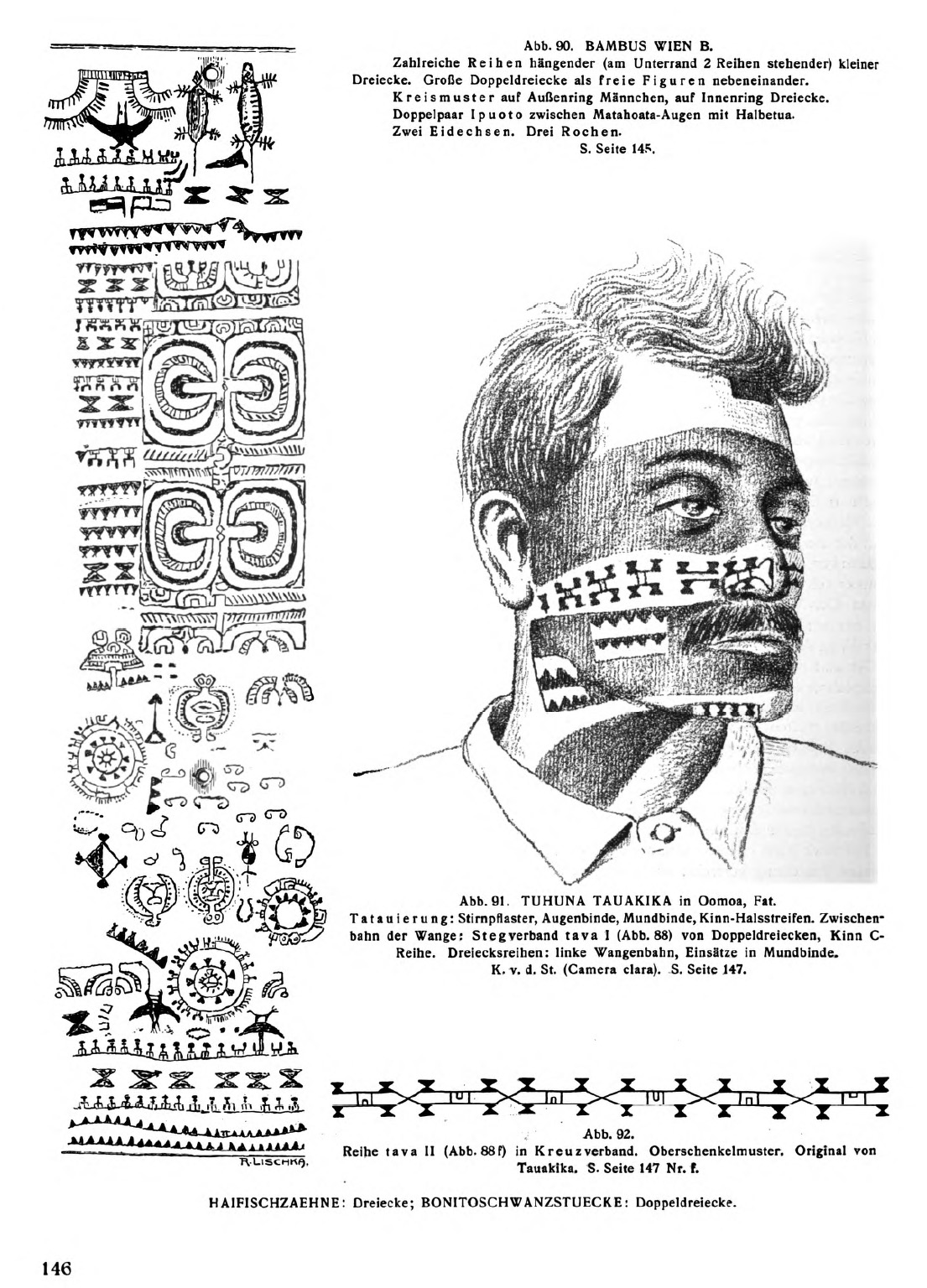
v.d.Steinen vol.1, tattoos on Marquesas.

Karl von den Steinen (born March 7, 1855, in Mülheim, died November 4, 1929, in Kronberg im Taunus) was a German physician (with emphasis in psychiatry), ethnologist, explorer, and author of important anthropological work, which is particularly to the study of Indian cultures of Central Brazil, and the art of the Marquesas. He laid the permanent foundations for Brazilian ethnology.

== Exploration ==
- 1879-1881: A journey around the earth
- 1882-1883: First German International Polar Year Expedition to South Georgia
- 1884: The first expedition to the Xingu River region of Brazil (see Xingu Indigenous Park)
- 1887-1888: Second Expedition into the Xingú region (Brazil)
- 1897-1898: expedition to the South Sea Islands (Marquesas)

== Works ==
- Durch Central-Brasilien: Expedition zur Erforschung des Schingú im J. 1884 (Through Central-Brazil: expedition to explore the Xingú in the year 1884). Brockhaus, Leipzig 1886; Reprint: Fines Mundi, Saarbrücken 2006
- Die Bakaïrí-Sprache: Wörterverzeichnis, Sätze, Sagen, Grammatik; mit Beiträgen zu einer Lautlehre der karaïbischen Grundsprache (The Bakairi language: vocabulary, sentences, stories, grammar, phonetics, with contributions to a basic language of the Caribs). Koehler, Leipzig 1892
- Unter den Naturvölkern Zentral-Brasiliens (Among the primitive peoples of Central Brazil) Reiseschilderungen und Ergebnisse der zweiten Schingú-Expedition 1887–1888 (Travel accounts and results of the second Schingú Expedition 1887-1888). Geographic Verlagsbuchhandlung von Dietrich Reimer, Berlin 1894, Reprint: Fines Mundi, Saarbrücken 2006
- Die Marquesaner und ihre Kunst: Studien über die Entwicklung primitiver Südseeornamentik nach eigenen Reiseergebnissen und dem Material der Museen (The Marquesas and their Art: studies on the evolution of primitive Südseeornamentik results according to travel and material of the museums), 3 volumes, Reimer, Berlin 1925–1928; Reprint: NY 1969; Reprint: Fines Mundi, Saarbrücken 2006
  - Volume 1 Tattooing: a history of the island group and a comparative introduction to the Polynesian custom, 1925
  - Volume 2 Plastic: with an introduction on "Material Culture" and an appendix "Ethnographic additions, 1928
  - Volume 3, The library, 1928

== See also ==
- Marquesan Dog
