= Kabang =

Dog from the Philippines

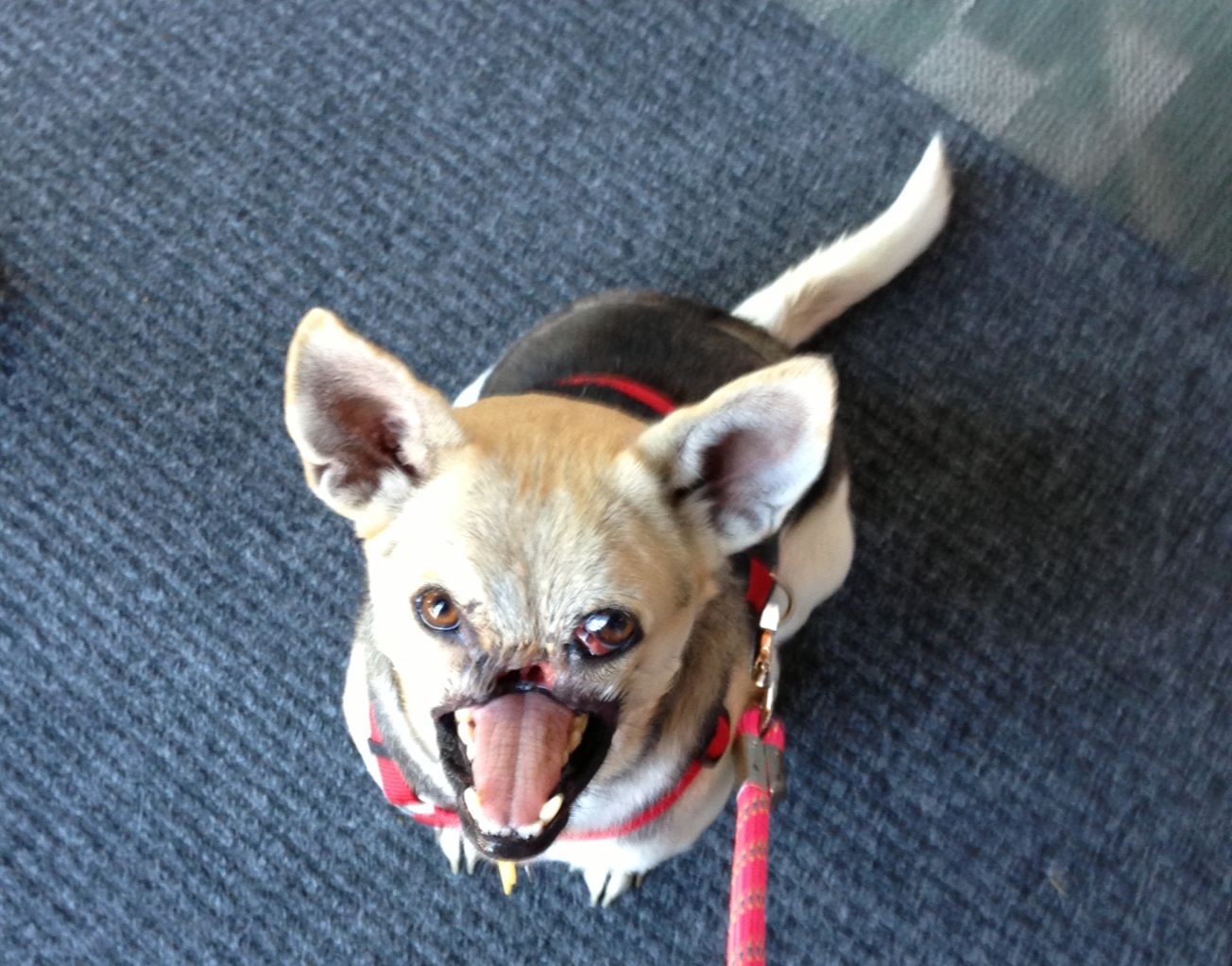
- Kabang in June 2013
- Species: Canis lupus familiaris
- Breed: Aspin
- Sex: Female
- Born: February 29, 2008; Zamboanga City, Philippines
- Died: May 17, 2021 (aged 13)
- Resting place: Zamboanga City
- Nationality: Philippines
- Known for: Saving the lives of two children in a motorcycle accident
- Owner: Rudy Banggal

Kabang (February 29, 2008 – May 17, 2021) was a shepherd mix aspin from Zamboanga City, Philippines, who became internationally famous and was described as a "hero dog" when she rescued two children from a potentially fatal motorcycle crash.

== Life ==
=== Motorcycle accident ===
Kabang was a dog that was adopted by Rudy Bunggal as a stray puppy. In December 2011, Bunggal's 9-year-old daughter Dina and a 3-year-old cousin, Princess Diansing, attempted to cross a busy street in the path of a motorcycle. Seeing the danger, Kabang jumped at the motorcycle, knocking it over. According to eyewitnesses, the girls did not see the motorcycle coming and would have been seriously injured if not for Kabang. The motorcycle driver and the children suffered only minor bruises from the accident. Kabang, however, got caught in the front wheel of the motorcycle. "The bones holding her upper snout were crushed, and we could not do anything to save it", said Bunggal. "We just pulled her off the wheel". Kabang ran off, but re-emerged at the family home about two weeks later.

=== Recognition and recovery ===
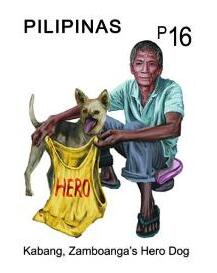
Kabang depicted on a 2023 stamp

In the accident, Kabang had suffered extensive injuries to her nose and upper jaw but Bunggal refused to have the dog euthanized. Kabang, heralded by the Philippine press as a hero, had difficulty eating but otherwise continued living normally and even became pregnant. However, over time her open mouth led to an infection, and as long as it remained open she was at serious risk for further problems. Kabang was given antibiotics, but repairing her face via surgery was beyond the means of the Bunggal family.

In February 2012, Karen Kenngott, a nurse from upstate New York, saw Kabang's story on the Internet and decided to help. She organized a grassroots fundraiser called "Care for Kabang". Initial efforts were unsuccessful, but with the help of the Animal Welfare Coalition, the campaign was relaunched in the summer of 2012. They met their goal within four weeks. The campaign also greatly increased Kabang's fame internationally. "She has become a superstar," said Bunggal in July 2012. "People come here to have their photos taken with the dog."

Kabang was brought to the William R. Pritchard Veterinary Medical Teaching Hospital at UC Davis in the United States during October 2012 to undergo a specialized surgery. Preliminary evaluations revealed that Kabang had heartworms and a transmissible venereal tumor, a type of cancer. She began chemotherapy a week after arriving. Because of Kabang's preexisting conditions, surgery was delayed until March 2013 when she was treated. The surgery was a success and Kabang was released from UC Davis' care on June 3, 2013. The $27,000 total cost of the treatments and surgery was paid for by donations from people in 47 different countries.

Kabang arrived back in the Philippines on June 8, 2013, where she was given a hero's welcome in her hometown of Zamboanga City. Veterinarian Anton Lim, Kabang's caretaker, remarked "[Kabang is] as normal as she can be. She doesn't need any special medication. So aside from the aesthetic, she's normal."

=== Death and legacy ===
Kabang died in her sleep on May 17, 2021, at the age of 13. She was buried near a statue of Francis of Assisi in Zamboanga City in July 2021. An aluminum statue in Pasonanca, Zamboanga City, was inaugurated on August 13, 2021, in her honor. Kabang was included in the book Dogs in Philippine History, which chronicles the key moments since the first domesticated dogs appeared in the Philippines. Additionally, she was depicted in the "Dogs in Philippine History Special Stamps" stamp set.

== See also ==
- List of individual dogs
