= Philippine Forest Dog =

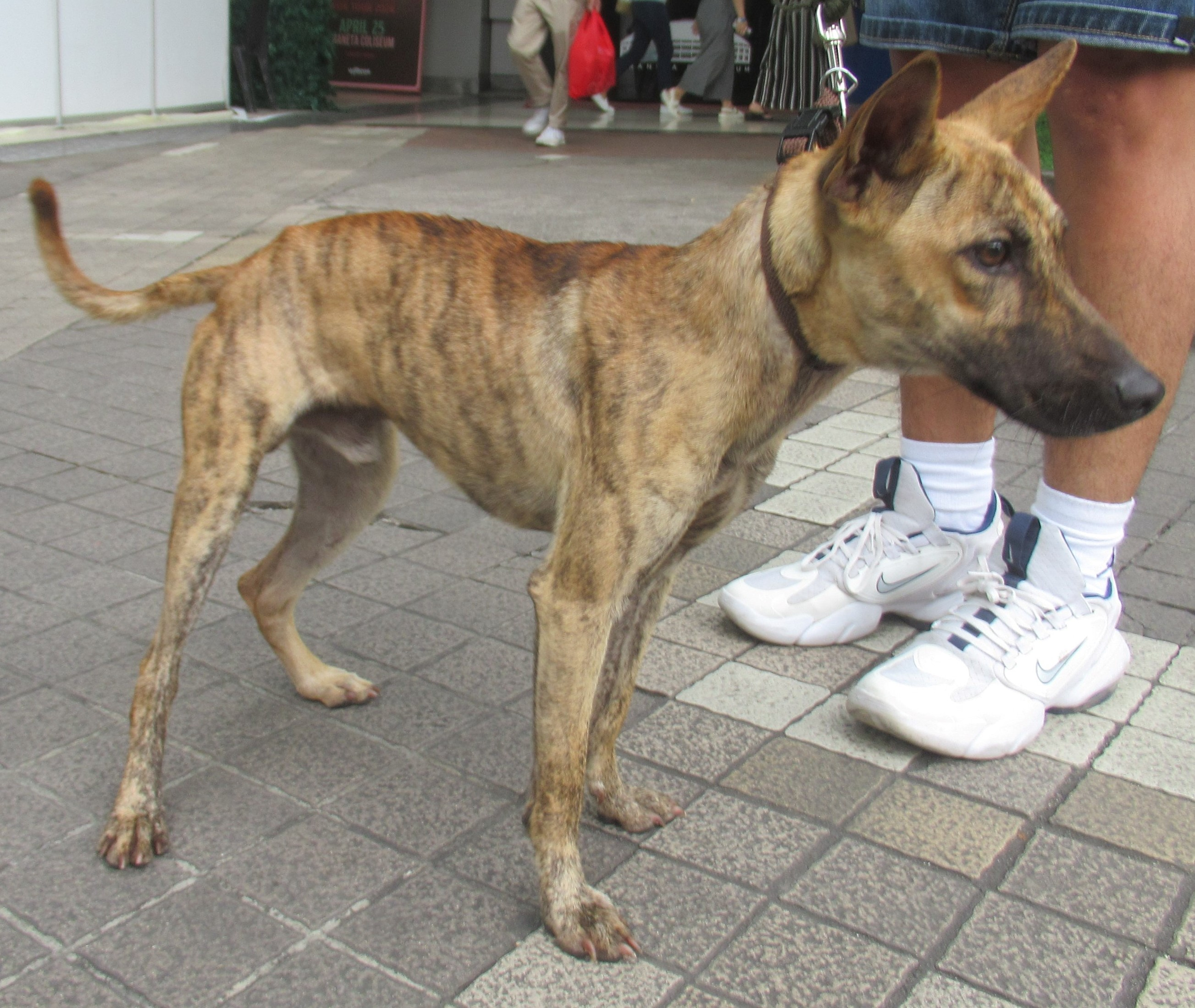
- Kidlat, one of the Philippine forest dogs of the Philippine Forest Dog Legacy Club, Inc.
- Origin: Philippines
Traits
- Coat: Short, may be smooth or coarse
- Color: Brindle, black and merle (presence of white markings could be present and should not exceed 2/3 of the total body parts)

The Philippine Forest Dog (locally known as asong gubat) is an indigenous and primitive dog breed originating from the Philippines. The Philippine Canine Club, Inc. (PCCI), in collaboration with the Philippine Forest Dog Legacy Club, Inc. (PFDLC), is documenting and establishing the breed's purity with the aim of achieving recognition from the Fédération Cynologique Internationale (FCI). The Philippine Forest Dog was introduced internationally as the first official native dog breed of the Philippines during the Philippine Circuit Show 2023.

== History ==
The Philippine Forest Dog may have existed for approximately 30,000 years. Early settlers are believed to have brought the ancestors of this breed to the Philippines as companions and hunting dogs. The breed has lived alongside indigenous Aetas since before the Spanish colonization of the Philippines. Archaeological findings indicate that this breed predates its modern discovery, with dog remains estimated to be 600–900 years old unearthed in 1967 at an ancient gravesite in Namayan, Santa Ana, Manila.

== Appearance ==
The Philippine Forest Dog is a small- to medium-sized breed historically used by Filipinos for hunting wild animals, catching vermin, and farm work. These traits and its distinctive morphology have been preserved through selective breeding. The Philippine Forest Dog standard describes a vigorous, agile, and athletic dog capable of performing as a functional working dog in forest environments. As a primitive breed, PFDs are adapted to survive the challenging climate and terrain of their native land.

The breed standard and interpretation followed by the Philippine Canine Club, Inc. (PCCI), were written by Rev. Fr. Dante Daylusan, a Philippine Forest Dog researcher and breeder. The standard was developed over 30 years of continuous study and research based on the guidelines of the Fédération Cynologique Internationale (FCI).

To ensure adherence to this standard, the Philippine Forest Dog Legacy Club, Inc. (PFDLC) established and recognized six official integrity breeders dedicated to maintaining the breed's morphology, temperament, and correct coloration. Prospective owners are encouraged to acquire dogs only from these endorsed breeders to avoid mixed or brindle-colored dogs not conforming to the standard.

== Temperament ==
As a primitive breed, the Philippine Forest Dog tends to be reserved with strangers but loyal and dependable with its human family, including children. Although domesticated, it retains a strong survival instinct and can endure independently in forested areas. This breed may display a strong protective temperament and is often chosen as a guard dog despite its size.

== See also ==
- Askal
- Taiwan Dog
- Polynesian Dog
- Domesticated plants and animals of Austronesia
- List of dog breeds
