= Taiwan Dog =

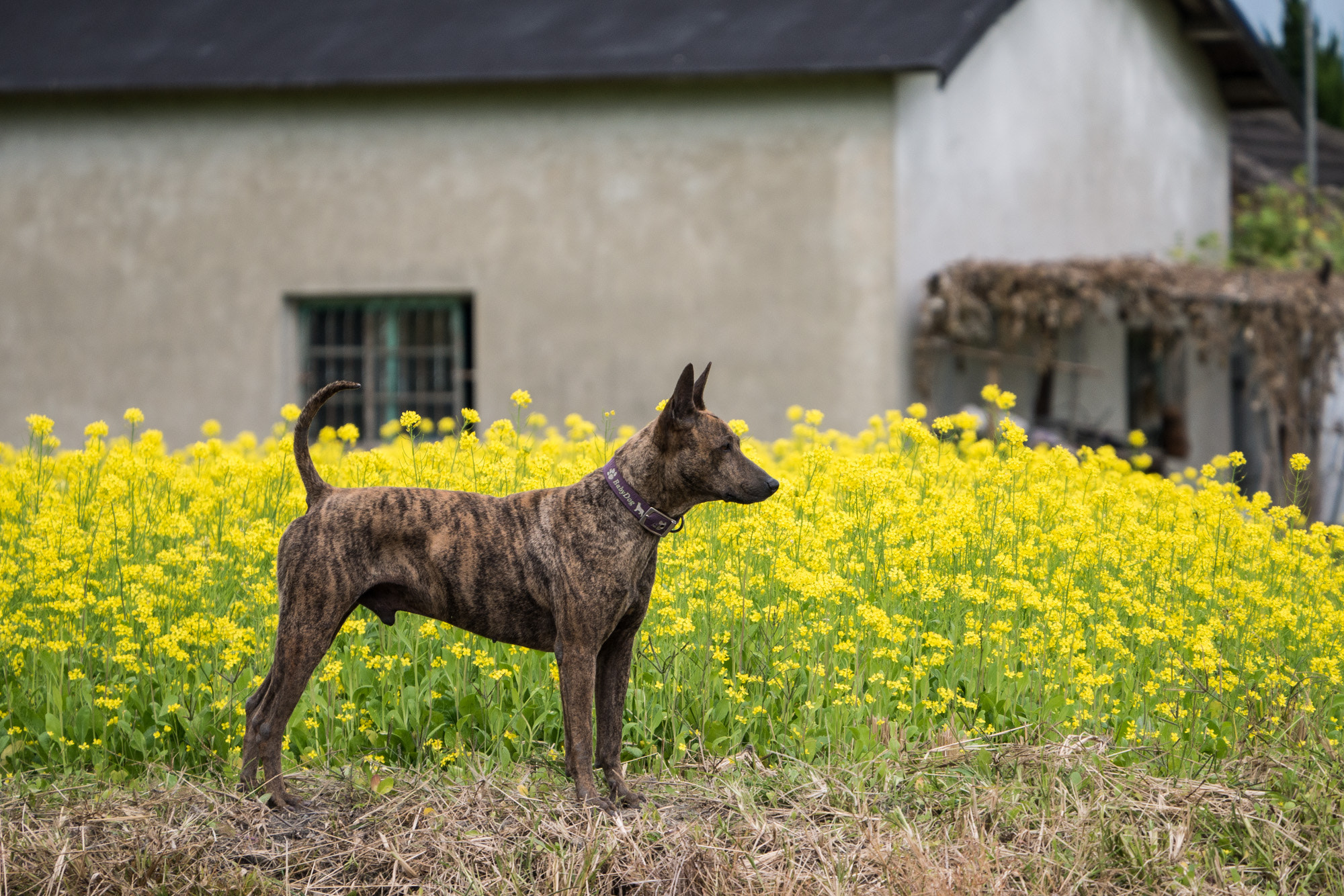
- A Taiwan Dog standing near rapeseed
- Other names: Formosan Mountain Dog (福爾摩莎犬); Takasago Dog (高砂犬)
- Origin: Taiwan
Traits
Height	Males	48–52 cm (19–20 in)
	Females	43–47 cm (17–19 in)
Weight	Males	14–18 kg (31–40 lb)
	Females	12–16 kg (26–35 lb)
- Color: Black, earthy yellow, or yellowish-brown
Kennel club standards
- Fédération Cynologique Internationale: standard

The Taiwan Dog (Chinese: 台灣犬) is a breed of small or medium dog indigenous to Taiwan. These dogs are also known as the Formosan Mountain Dog. Taiwan Dogs have been genetically traced back between 10,000 and 20,000 years ago, making them one of the oldest and most primitive dog breeds in the world. They are well-adapted to the uneven and thickly forested terrain of Taiwan, having become a semi-wild breed prior to the arrival of several colonial reigns and foreign powers. Notwithstanding these adaptations, Formosans retained the potential to be trained and are now used as hunting dogs, guard dogs, stunt dogs, rescue dogs, or simply as companions. Formosans are classified into one medium type and two small types.

== Appearance ==
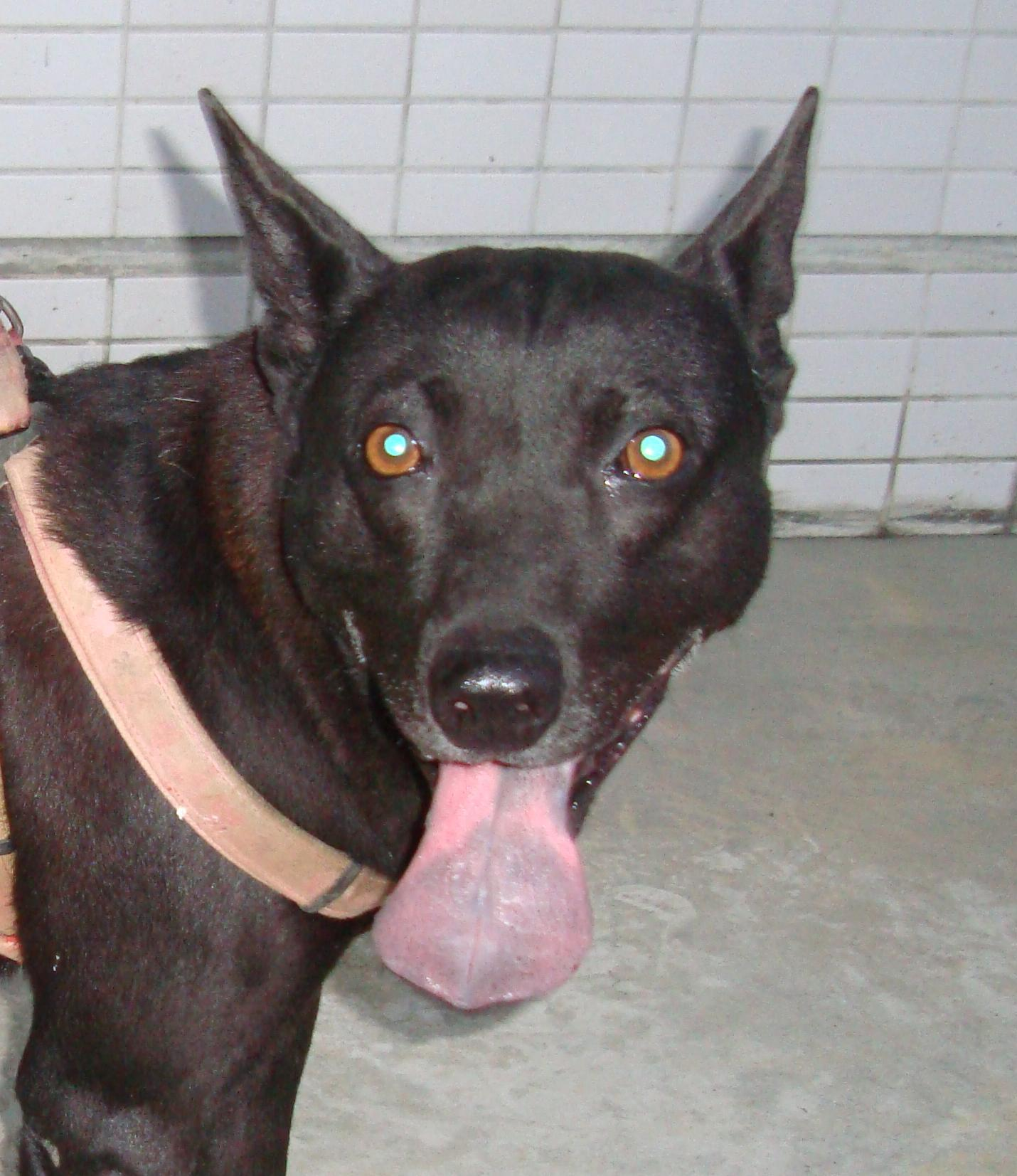
A close-up of a Taiwanese Dog face showing the upright ears, almond eyes, triangular face, black nose, and the black coating on the tongue.

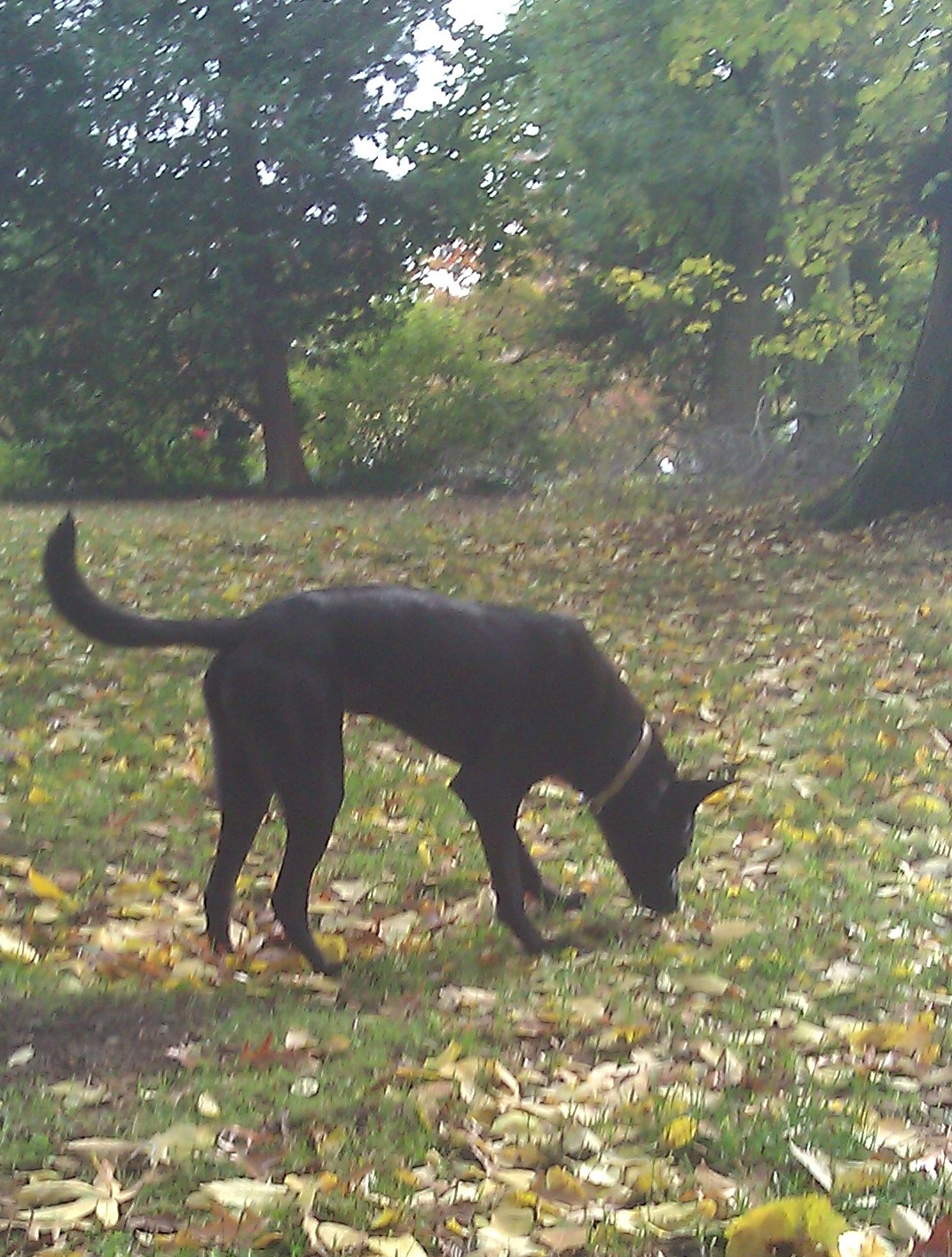
Young Taiwan dog in Seattle, WA, U.S.

There are two small types of the Formosan Mountain Dog; one is about 40 centimetres (16 in) tall at the shoulder and the other is around 30 centimetres (12 in). However, the latter one was not found during the research conducted by Dr. Sung Yung-yi (宋永義) in 1976. The medium type of the Formosan Mountain Dog has a shoulder height under 50 centimetres (20 in), with a firm and fit body, slim waist, big chest and half-covered ears. The most common type of these three in recent years is the medium-sized dog. Its color can range from black to earthy yellow or yellowish-brown and the nose is black. Black coating on the tongue is one of the most distinguished traits of the Formosan Mountain Dog.

Dr. Sung of the National Taiwan University and Mr. Ming Jie, Xu of the Formosan Dog & Guard Dogs Breeding Center (台灣犬護衛犬繁殖中心) described a typical Formosan as having almond eyes, firm jaw strength, black coating on the tongue, a triangular face, thin prick ears and a sickle tail. The tail is upright or curved with a thick fur coat, but the belly is hairless; the tail is used to warm the belly and may even be long enough to protect the snout from insects. The dog is also well known for being well-balanced.

=== Movement ===
Formosan dogs are particularly agile; they are known for their hopping skill, especially when they are hunting small animals, such as rats. When they are startled or trying to intimidate their target, they will hop sideways back and forth. Unlike Rottweilers and German Shepherds, Formosan dogs do not hold their bite on their target. This habit is adopted and may be traced back to early boar hunting. Taiwanese aborigines used five to six Formosan dogs to circle a wild boar and each dog would work to wound the boar. They would release their bite once they had attacked it and wait for the next attack again and again until the boar was exhausted enough for their master to move in for the final kill.

=== FCI Standard ===
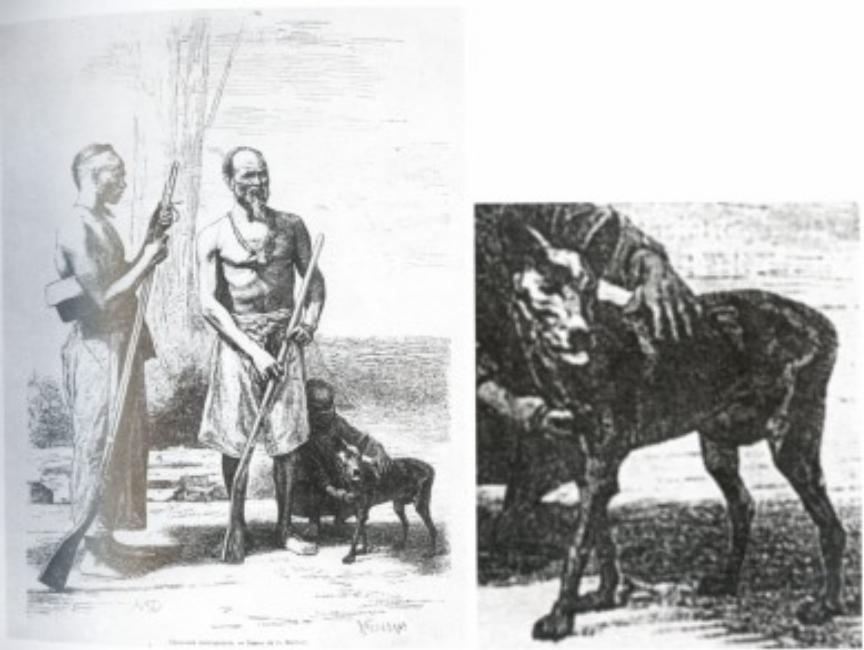
Taken by British photographer John Thomson at Taiwan, in 1871

- Proportions
  - Depth of chest:height at withers = 4.5:10 to 4.7:10
  - Height at withers:length of body = 10:10.5, females can be slightly longer.
  - Length of muzzle:length of skull = 4.5:5.5.
- Size & weight
  - Height: Dogs: 48–52 cm (19–20 in) : 43–47 cm (17–19 in)
  - Weight: Dogs: 14 to 18 kg (31 to 40 lb) : 12 to 16 kg (26 to 35 lb)
- Head
  - Cranial Region:
  - Forehead: Broad and roundish, without wrinkles.
  - Skull: The skull is slightly longer than the muzzle.
  - Stop: Well defined with a slight furrow.
- Facial Region :
  - Nose: Moderate size. Wide nostrils. Black in color, but can be slightly lighter in all colors except for the ones with black fur.
  - Muzzle: Flat nasal bridge. Tight lips, without flews. The muzzle tapers a little from the base to the nose, but it is not pointed at the tip.
  - Jaws/teeth: Jaws are strong. Scissors bite, teeth are set square to the jaws.
  - Cheeks: Well developed and slightly protruding.
  - Eyes: Almond in shape. Dark brown in colour. Brown is also acceptable, but yellow or light eyes should be avoided.
  - Ears: Pricked, set on sides of the skull at an angle of 45 degrees. Inside of the outline is straight, while outside of the outline is slightly rounded.
- Neck: Muscular, strong, good length, slightly arched. Without dewlap.
- Body:
  - General: Sinewy and muscular, nearly square in shape.
  - Back: Straight and short. Withers well developed.
  - Loin: Firmly muscled.
  - Croup: Broad. Flat or very slightly sloping and short.
  - Chest: Fairly deep yet not reaching the elbow. Forechest slightly protruding. Ribs are well sprung.
  - Belly: Well tucked up.
- Tail: In the shape of a sickle, set on high, carried erect, active, with the tip curving forward.
- Limbs:
- Forequarters:
  - Shoulders: Well muscled. Shoulder blades are laid back. They should meet the upper arms at an angle of 105-110 degrees.
  - Elbows: Close to the body.
  - Forearms: Straight and parallel to each other.
  - Metacarpus (Pasterns): Firm.
- Hindquarters: Hindlegs should be slender, with good bone, well muscled and parallel to each other. The rear angulation should be in balance to the front.
  - Upper thighs: Broad, sloping and well bent at the stifle.
  - Lower thighs: Should be in balance with upper thighs.
  - Metatarsus (Rear pastern): Perpendicular to the ground.
- Feet turning neither in nor out. Pads are firm and thick. Nails are black in colour, but lighter colors are acceptable in all colors except for those with black coats.
- Gait/movement: Powerful gait with reaching stride. Agile enough to easily turn 180 degrees quickly.
- Coat/hair: Short and hard, lying tight to the body. Length is between 1.5 and 3 cm (0.59 and 1.18 in).
- Color: Black, brindle, fawn, white, white and black, white and fawn, white and brindle.

== Temperament and behaviour ==
The Formosan is a high energy, loyal, affectionate and intelligent breed that learns very quickly. In unfamiliar situations, they tend to be wary of strangers and sounds, and they can become fear-aggressive. In new situations where the dog is fear-aggressive, it can take a few days before the dog will calm down.

If comfortable and well-trained, the Formosan will be friendly to people and other animals, though they tend to be a bit aloof or suspicious of strangers once they have bonded with their owner. When kept as a family pet, they often form a strong bond with one member of the family and may act stand-offish toward other family members, leading some to describe them as one-person dogs. Once bonded, they are extremely loyal and affectionate to their owners.

Due to the breed's alertness, these dogs can make good guard dogs; if not well-trained, the Formosan can become overly protective and aggressive toward strangers.

== History ==
=== Four catastrophes ===
There are four catastrophic events described by Dr. Sung Yung-yi that have been critical in the development of the Formosan Mountain Dog: the Dutch settlement of Formosa, the Japanese rule, World War II and the Kuomintang Era.

==== The Dutch settlement ====
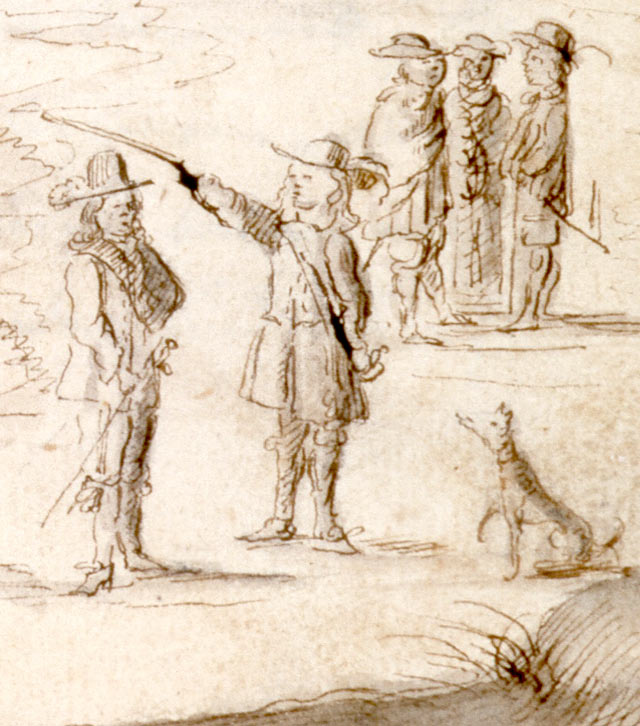
Dutch, Spanish and Han colonization in the 17th century with sketch of the "Flying Dog". Many Dutchmen kept dogs to help in the hunt. Detail from "Landdag Ceremony on Taiwan", drawing by Caspar Schmalkalden in 1652.

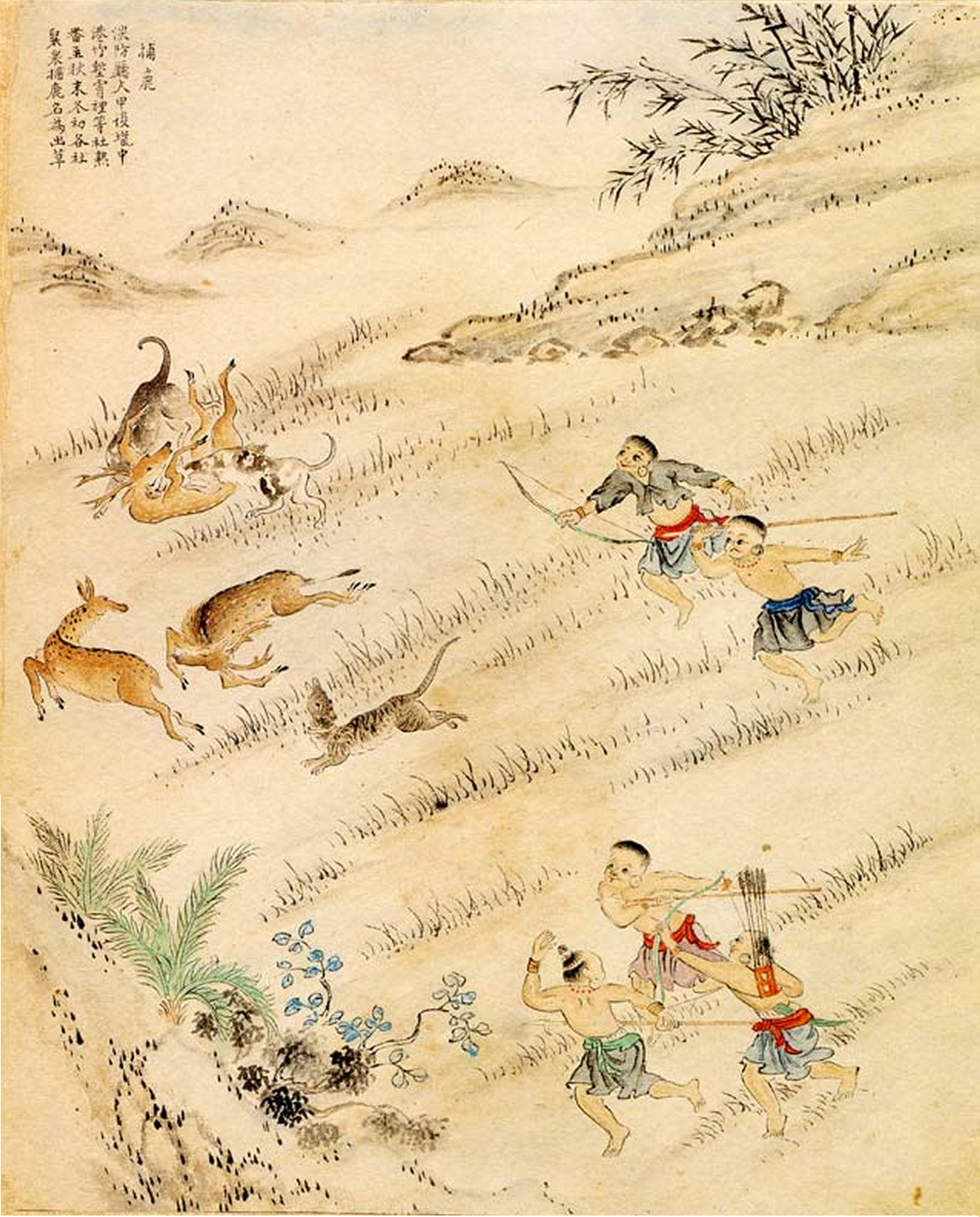
"Hunting Deer": Before this piece was drawn, the natives hunted for subsistence, calling the act "stepping onto the grass". When the grass grew lush in spring, the tribes harkened to the call for the hunt, bringing all tools and hunting dogs, such as the Formosan Mountain Dog. Painted in 1746.

In 1624, the Dutch established a commercial base at Tayoan, the colonial capital (present-day Anping in Tainan). After the Dutch made Taiwan a colony, they began to import workers from Fujian and Penghu (Pescadores) as laborers, many of whom settled there.

The Dutch military presence was concentrated at a stronghold called Castle Zeelandia. The Dutch colonists imported a hunting dog (known as the "Flying Dog" (Traditional Chinese: 飛狗)) to Taiwan and started to hunt the native Formosan sika deer (Cervus nippon taioanus) that inhabited Taiwan. The Dutch East India Company established a trading post whose main business was the export of sika skins to Europe. During the six decades of Dutch activity 2,000,000 to 4,000,000 sika skins were exported to Japan and China, contributing to the eventual extinction of the subspecies on the island. The "Flying Dog" was thought to be a Greyhound or an English Pointer.

Exporting was reduced when the Dutch were forced out of Taiwan in 1684, but continued throughout the Qing period with a switch to Japan as the major export market.

During the settlement, the Dutch hunting dogs started to crossbreed with the Formosan Mountain Dogs; this was the first time that foreign breeds had influenced the Formosan Mountain Dog. Furthermore, the Dutch prohibited native tribes from owning dogs, slaughtering large numbers of the indigenous dogs.

==== The Japanese rule ====
The Qing Empire was defeated in the First Sino-Japanese War of 1894–95. When the Treaty of Shimonoseki was signed on April 17, 1895, Taiwan was ceded to Japan, which sought to transform Taiwan into the supply-end of an extremely unequal flow of assets. The Japanese made efforts to exert full control over the aborigines, the first time this had ever been carried out. The means of accomplishing this goal took three main forms: anthropological study of the natives of Taiwan, attempts to reshape the aborigines in the mould of the Japanese culture, and military suppression. During Japanese rule, Taiwanese aborigines were under repressive rule and the Formosan Mountain Dogs were intensively crossbred with Japanese dogs, due to the Japanese government relocating many remote high-mountain villages closer to administrative control. Furthermore, Japanese immigrants massively explored the east coast, currently called Hualien and Taitung Counties. The east coast expeditions further provided a chance of crossbreeding Japanese dogs with the Formosans.

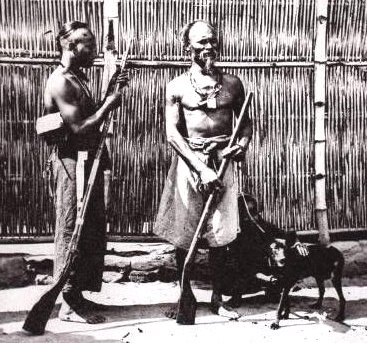
An aboriginal hunting party in Ba̍k-sa, Formosan dog at the bottom right corner. Photo by John Thomson, 1871: "A Native Hunting Party Baksa Formosa 1871".

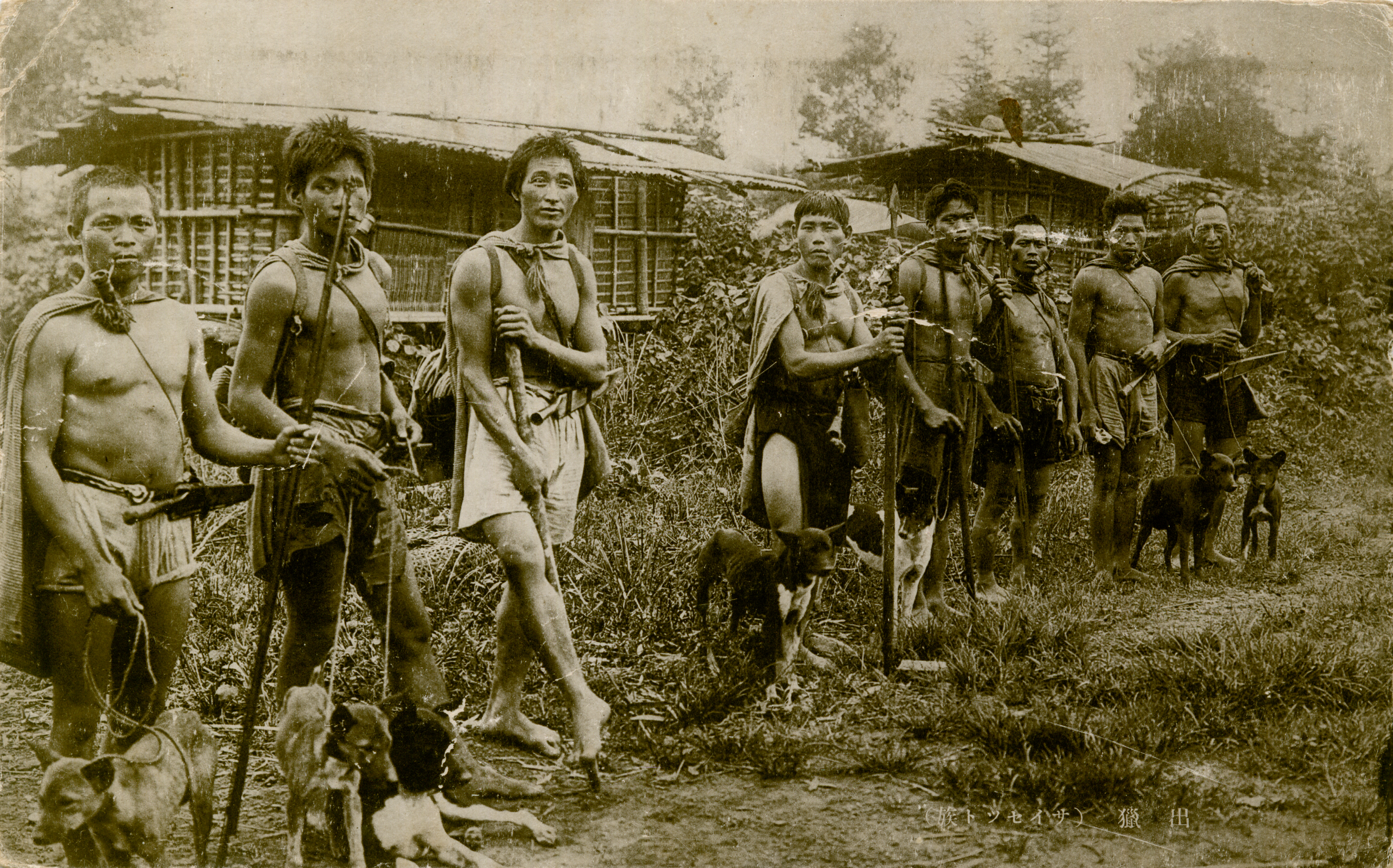
From a collection of National Geographic photos ca. 1939, taken by Japanese photographer Katsuyama (幽芳勝山) with the Saisiyat people.

==== World War II ====
At the end of World War II, for military purposes and preventing the U.S. Army from landing on the east coast of Taiwan, Japan started to build the Central and Southern Cross-Island Highway. During the construction, there were military dogs traveling with the highway workers, German Shepherds. This led to crossbreeding between the Formosans and the military dogs. If it were not for these strategic constructions, the Formosans may have had a chance to preserve their bloodline high in the mountains. Furthermore, during this period, there was evidence showing that the Japanese military launched a massacre to reduce the population of the Formosan Mountain Dog. However, the true reason for this may never be known.

Dr. Sung Yung-yi (宋永義) told a New Taiwan journalist: "Formosan dogs are very smart and agile, but they are more primitive animal, and do not want to be caged. For example, during birth period, they will find a cave and usually will not return until few months later with their puppies. Another example will be the masters do not need to provide a lot of foods for them, they have the habit of finding their own foods. These were the reason Formosan was called the "barbarian dog," by Japanese. Using sanitation as an excuse, Japanese military launched a large-scale massacre of Formosan to reduce the local dog population."

During the time when the Japanese military was building the Central and Southern Cross-Island Highway, they were constantly encountered by the aborigines. The aborigines launched numerous assaults to the Japanese military bases. During the assaults, Formosan dogs also gathered and hunted down Japanese military dogs, leaving a bloody scene in the morning. For revenge, the Japanese military killed every Formosan dog they saw to reduce the population.

==== The Kuomintang Era ====
Dr. Sung Yung-yi believes that the true reason that led to the Formosan Mountain Dog's near-extinction is the dog-eating culture. It was brought in along with the Chinese Nationalist Party's retreat in 1945, due to the loss to the Soviet-supported Chinese Communist Party (led by Mao Zedong) at the end of the Second Sino-Japanese War in 1945.

Furthermore, more foreign dogs were introduced into Taiwan. With lack of conservative and pet care knowledge, many foreign dogs were abandoned and started crossbreeding with Formosan Dogs. Dr. Sung believes that these are the two true reasons that affect the Formosan Mountain Dog's living space and the space for existence.

== Threats ==
=== Crossbreeding ===
The introduction of a variety of foreign dogs to Taiwan in the past was also a big threat to preserving the bloodline of the Formosan. A lot of dogs non-native to Taiwan were brought over during the Kuomintang Era and many were released into the wild. These began mating with the native Formosans, making purebred Formosans harder and harder to find in the wild.

=== Breeding problems ===
The Formosan Mountain Dog was originally kept by Taiwanese aborigines as hunting dogs, but now purebred Formosans are extremely rare and valuable. Since pure Formosans are extremely rare, there is a high risk of genetic disorders and unstable behavior due to the shallow gene pool. For this reason, crossing Formosans with other breeds occurred often due to the lack of pure females with steady traits. This is one of the major reasons modern Formosans look different, compared to old photos or documents from the early days. Some insist it is a natural change which does not affect the whole breed, while others actively fight to preserve the "pure" bloodline. Nevertheless, this breed is now popular all across the island as a watchdog and companion dog.

== Study ==
Taiwan Dogs are originally native Taiwanese dogs, descendants of the South Asian hunting dogs called "pariah dogs" which ancient local inhabitants used to live with in the central mountainous districts. This breed was the loyal companion of the ancient hunter in the wild forest. In 1980, a cooperative study was carried out by the research team of Dr. Sung Yung-yi (宋永義)National Taiwan University, the Japanese Gifu University and Ota Keming's(太田克明) research team from Nagoya University. Scholars targeted native Taiwan dogs as their subject, by visiting 29 tribes of local inhabitants. As a result, it was confirmed that the present Taiwan Dog is a descendant of the South Asian hunting dogs. This project was originally Ota Keming's idea, as he was tracing the origin of Japanese indigenous dogs, so he sought Dr. Sung Yung-yi's help in completing his research project.

Of the 46 purebloods that Sung Yung-yi found during 1976–1980, blood tests showed that they were related to dogs found in southern Japan and that they were descendants of the South Asian Hunting Dog. Little known outside of Taiwan, only "purebred" Formosans are recognized with a pedigree from the Kennel Club of Taiwan (KCT), the Taiwan Kennel Club and the international canine organization known as the FCI.

== Current ==
=== Conservation status ===
Since 1976, many Taiwanese ecologists have tried to convince the Taiwanese government to take action on forming a Formosan research team to help and preserve the pure indigenous Formosan by potentially replicating the dingo's model from Australia. The most notable action taken was by Dr. Sung Yung-yi. In 1983, he spoke at a conference on the Formosan sika deer and requested Taiwan's government to take immediate action to protect Formosan Mountain Dogs. Dr. Sung's request was made because he and his colleagues had difficulties in finding pure-blood Formosan Mountain Dogs during his five-year studies from 1976 to 1980. In order to find a sufficient population for his study, he located 29 Taiwanese aboriginal villages in the mountain ranges and initiated a mass search. Nevertheless, only 46 out of 160 Formosan Mountain Dogs he found had an A-rank purity. Out of these 46 Formosans, 25 were males and 21 were females. This number alerted the Food and Agriculture Organization (FAO) of the United Nations, as the animal was close to extinction.

Dr. Sung told the New Taiwan News on 26 Jan 2006, that, to this day, people in Taiwan do not have a strong respect for biodiversity. Dr. Sung believed that a Formosan Mountain Dog rehabilitation program should be encouraged by government efforts and carried out by careful planning. Currently, reproduction is the most urgent task. He believes, every Formosan Dog should be registered to a household, which specified mating. In recent years, Taiwan's government had not taken any action in protecting these indigenous Formosan Dogs. Dr. Sung also said that after learning how Taiwan's government handled the Formosan Sika Deer Rehabilitation Project, he was discouraged and did not dare have any thoughts on launching a conservation project for Formosan Dogs. He said, "For a developed country, Taiwan currently is not one yet."

=== Security/guard dogs ===
Currently, the ROC Air Force is considering the Formosan Dog for military purposes. At this time the ROC Air Force is using German Shepherds for security, but German Shepherds have some downsides. For instance, it was often found that German Shepherds who perform intensive security duties on a daily basis will suffer from serious bruising on their paws. Furthermore, they found that many German Shepherds' guarding mechanism towards strangers was not quite at the desired sensitivity. In many cases, strangers will need to get close for the dog to react. These factors caused the ROC Air Force to look to replace German Shepherds.

After half a month of testing, the ROC Air Force concluded that the Formosan Mountain Dog's senses of smell and hearing, dexterity and alertness towards strangers were all more suitable for the purpose of guarding their fighter jets. More importantly, the Formosan Mountain Dog does not suffer from the bruising of the paws as German Shepherds do. For this reason, it is likely that the ROC Air Force will replace German Shepherds with Formosan Mountain Dogs. The only concern for the ROC Air Force is that the Formosan Mountain Dog is physically less intimidating than a German Shepherd. Recently, the feasibility of replacing German Shepherds with Formosan Mountain Dogs has been tested.

=== Breeders ===
Most of the foundation stock owners and breeders are hesitant to make public appearances. They stay behind the scenes and sell only males to those who have Formosan Dog kennels and attend local dog shows. The most well-known and high-profile breeder is Ming Nan Chen. Like many born in the 1950s, Chen owned a Formosan as a child. In the 1980s he started a business dedicated to creating a purebred Formosan close to the one in his childhood memory, beginning with a single puppy that he purchased for NT$30,000 (about US$910.00) from an aboriginal man.

However, some argue that credit must be given to those breeders, as they are the ones who are keeping the bloodline pure. After two or three decades of breeding, training, improving and purification, it is now unable to fully distinguish the indigenous and the new breed. Further, it is also due to the subjective preferences of breeders and their belief of what the pureblooded Formosan should look like, which they created a different trend of the "pure-blood." Many claim that their Formosan Mountain Dogs are pureblooded. Such breeders also applied the "new type" of Formosan Mountain Dogs to the FCI to develop a "standard", which may be very different from what it originally should have looked like. In 2015 FCI proved the "standard" of Formosan Mountain Dogs.

Breeders also created a conflict in debating for the future of the Formosan Mountain Dogs, as maintaining its purity or modifying through hybridizing it into a new type. For breeders who support purity, they believe that there is no need in improving the breed through hybridization. However, breeders who support modifying believe that, since Formosan Mountain Dogs have been accidentally crossbred for centuries and it is not possible to identify and maintain its purity, then we should seek a "new type" of Formosan Mountain Dog with improvements. These two different points of view are still an ongoing debate and remain controversial.

== In popular culture ==
Taiwan Dog was voted as the official mascot of the Chinese Professional Baseball League in 2019.

On January 29, 2023, Google released a mini game on its home page through Google Doodle where the player has to control a Taiwan dog to make bubble tea for its customers. The game was to celebrate the iconic Taiwanese drink and its cultural influence since its invention in the 1980s.

== See also ==
- Askal
- Philippine forest dog
- Polynesian dog
- Domesticated plants and animals of Austronesia
- List of dog breeds
- List of endemic species of Taiwan
