= Askal =

Street dogs in the Philippines

- An off-leash pet female askal
- Other names: Ayam; Aspin
- Origin: Philippines
- Breed status: Not recognized as a breed by any major kennel club.

Askals, also called aspins, are a diverse population of mongrel free-ranging dogs found in the Philippines.

The term "askal" is a portmanteau from the Filipino language asong kalye, meaning "street dog". It is a neologism, commonly used as a derogatory term for describing stray or mixed-breed dogs that roam the streets of urban and rural areas across the country. It is considered to reflect class discrimination in the country, particularly towards indigenous elements. The euphemism "aspin" is a portmanteau of asong Pinoy, meaning "Filipino dog".

The origins of askals can be traced back to two main categories. Firstly, some askals are entirely descended from indigenous dog breeds that have evolved over time in the Philippines. Secondly, it is believed that dogs were introduced into the country from Mainland Asia, via Taiwan. Excavation sites reveal that dogs served two main purposes: consumption and companionship. Tagalogs, along with other ethnolinguistic groups like the Kalinga and Bontoc, were known to have domesticated these dogs into hunting companions, often forming close bonds, mourning their deaths, and burying them near their owners. They may have even been given the same burial treatment as humans. These native breeds have adapted to the local environment and exhibit a range of physical characteristics and temperaments. These dogs have since played an integral role in the lives of Filipinos, serving as loyal companions, guardians, and even working animals.

Askals often display a unique blend of characteristics from various ancestral backgrounds. This diversity contributes to their distinct appearance, temperament, and adaptability. They are highly adaptable and resilient dogs, capable of surviving in challenging conditions. They possess the ability to navigate the urban landscape and survive on scraps and leftovers. Their resourcefulness, intelligence, and innate street-smarts have earned them the nickname "asong kalye," reflecting their association with the streets.

In recent years, there has been a growing movement to celebrate and protect the cultural heritage represented by askals. Various organizations and animal welfare groups are working towards providing medical care, shelter, and adoption opportunities for stray and abandoned dogs. Additionally, initiatives have been launched to educate the public about responsible pet ownership, including spaying and neutering programs, vaccinations, and proper training.

August 18th is National Aspin Day, an annual event.

== Names ==
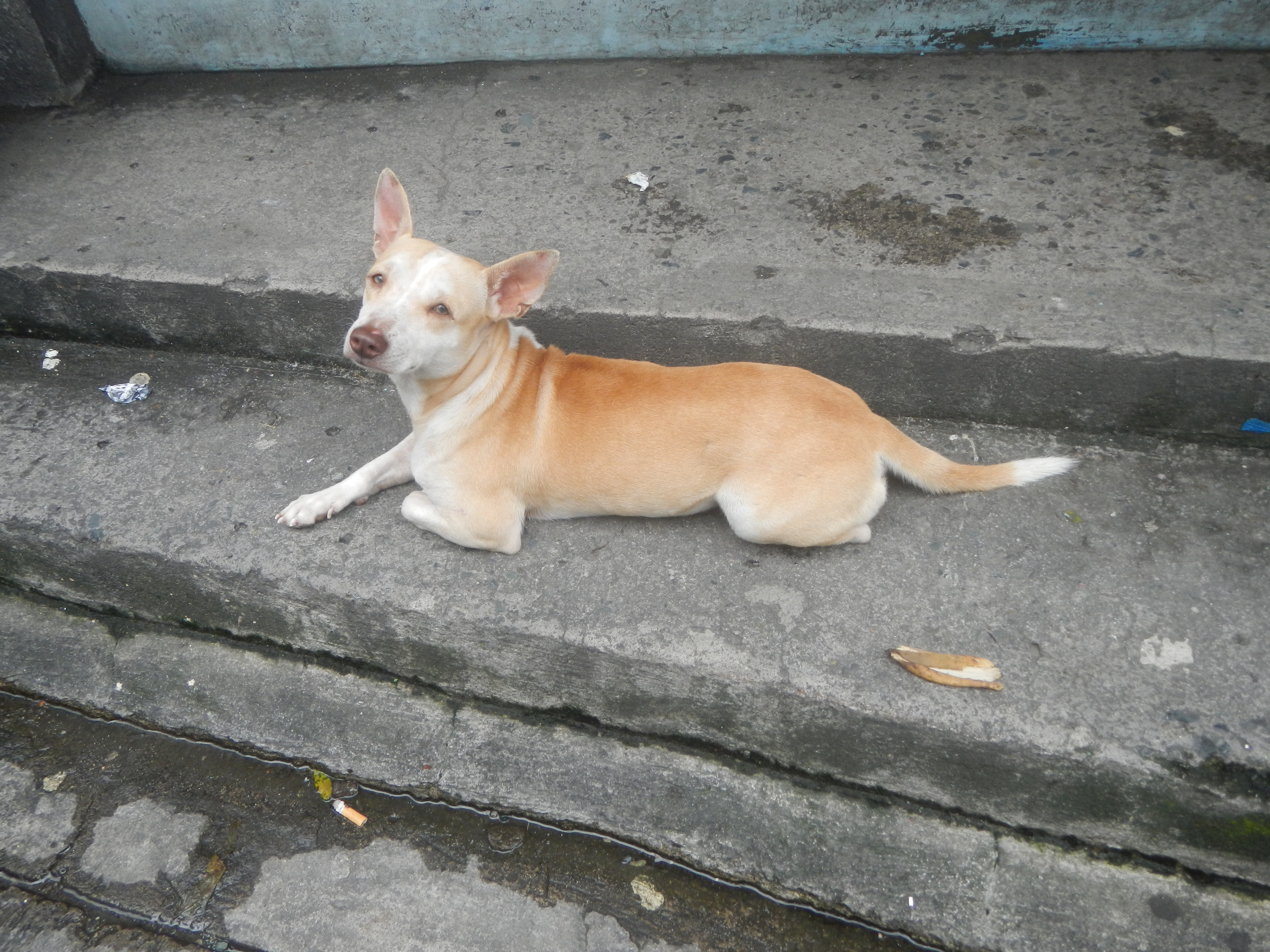
A stray askal in Metro Manila.

By the late 20th century, dogs commonly seen wandering the streets were called "askal", a Tagalog-derived portmanteau of asong kalye, which literally means street dog. In 2007, the Philippine Animal Welfare Society (PAWS) suggested the alternative term "aspin", short for asong Pinoy (Pinoy dog) to avoid the stigma associated with the term "askal".

In Cebuano, dogs are called irong Bisaya, which literally means "Visayan dog" or "native dog", (Note: The use of the word "Bisaya" does not explicitly mean "Visayan" but it is a term pertaining to people and animals native to a specific locale. For example, "manok Bisaya" simply refers to a breed of chicken native to a locality.) implying that these are not thought of as a mixed-breed dog so much as unbred mongrels with no purebred ancestors. This is only from a Visayan point of view since irong Bisaya does not differ in character or physical appearance from the other askals found in the Philippines. Physically, the dogs have "all shapes, configurations and sizes."

== Appearance ==
Aspins do not have clear lineages that contribute to what they look like today because they are bred from a diversity of mutts and mixed breeds that roam around Filipino streets. However, they have a few distinct characteristics.

Given their varied background, aspins can come in different shapes, sizes, and colors. The coat can be short-haired or rough. Coat colors ranges from black to brown, white, ginger, brindle, gray, cream, and red merle. Spots are commonly found at the base of the tail and on the back in semi-circular fashion. The snout sometimes appears black if the coat color is brown. The tail is usually held high and the ears can be floppy, semi-floppy or fully pointing upwards. The bone structure of a native Askal is on the medium range, never heavy as with the Rottweilers.

== Interactions with humans ==
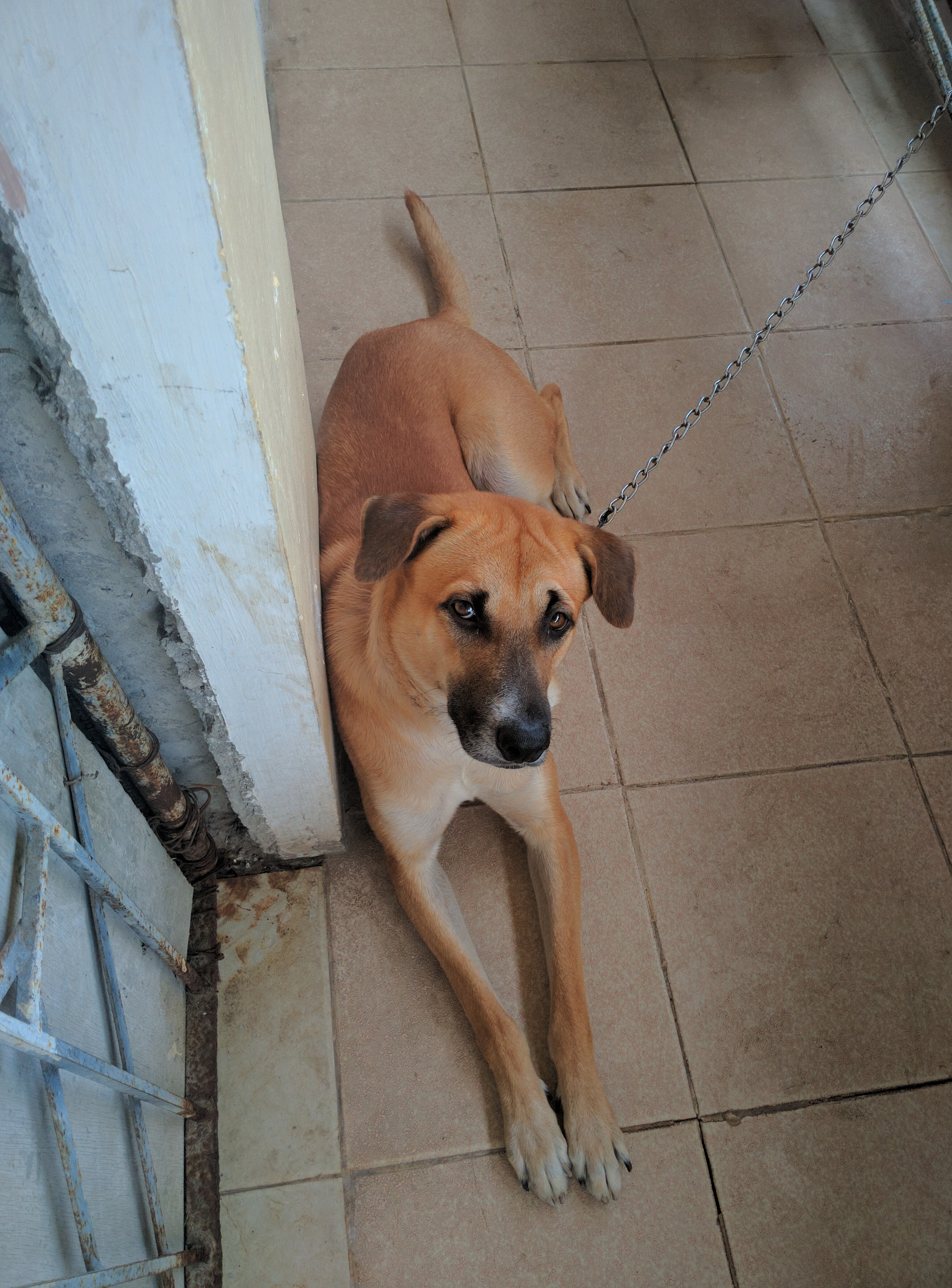
A male aspin dog with a leash on.

Askals is the Filipino word often used to refer to stray mixed-breed, indigenous dogs. According to the Philippine Animal Welfare Society, there are over twelve million strays in the Philippines as of 2019. Many consider it a problem because these dogs can go without much food or shelter their entire lives. The term "askals" can also refer to a domesticated, indigenous mixed-breed dog. They have been raised traditionally as guard dogs. They are naturally fearful and suspicious of strangers, independent and protective of family members. They are good with young children as companions, due to their devotion to family members.

They are trusted by their owners to roam markets or the neighborhood to socialize with other dogs which is why some domesticated dogs are seen by Westerners as stray dogs when in fact they may not be. They are, however, expected to be home before dusk, especially males who always look for females in heat. Female dogs do usually stay home and are excellent watchdogs.

Askals were allowed to compete in the First Philippine Dog Agility Championships in 2013. At the 2015 Pet Express Doggie Run in Pasay, askals were the featured dog. The dogs featured in an essay by Gilda Cordero-Fernando. Askals have also been trained by the Coast Guard and private security agencies as bomb and drug detection dogs.

== Notable askals ==
- Kabang, an askal who lost its snout while saving two young children
- Buboy, waited for his owner who had already died several days before. However, Buboy died after being run over by a vehicle.
- Boonrod, found paddling near a rig 130 miles (220 kilometers) off the coast of Thailand.
- Kilay, also known as ‘Chokoy’ called by his owner, an askal works as ‘porter’ in Polambato port, Cebu, Philippines where he was left by his owner.

== In popular culture ==
The Philippines national football team are nicknamed "Azkals", after the dog.

This is also referenced in a satirical educational institution and Internet meme named the "International State College of the Philippines" as 'Blue Aspins'

== Philippine Forest Dog or "Aso Ng Gubat” ==
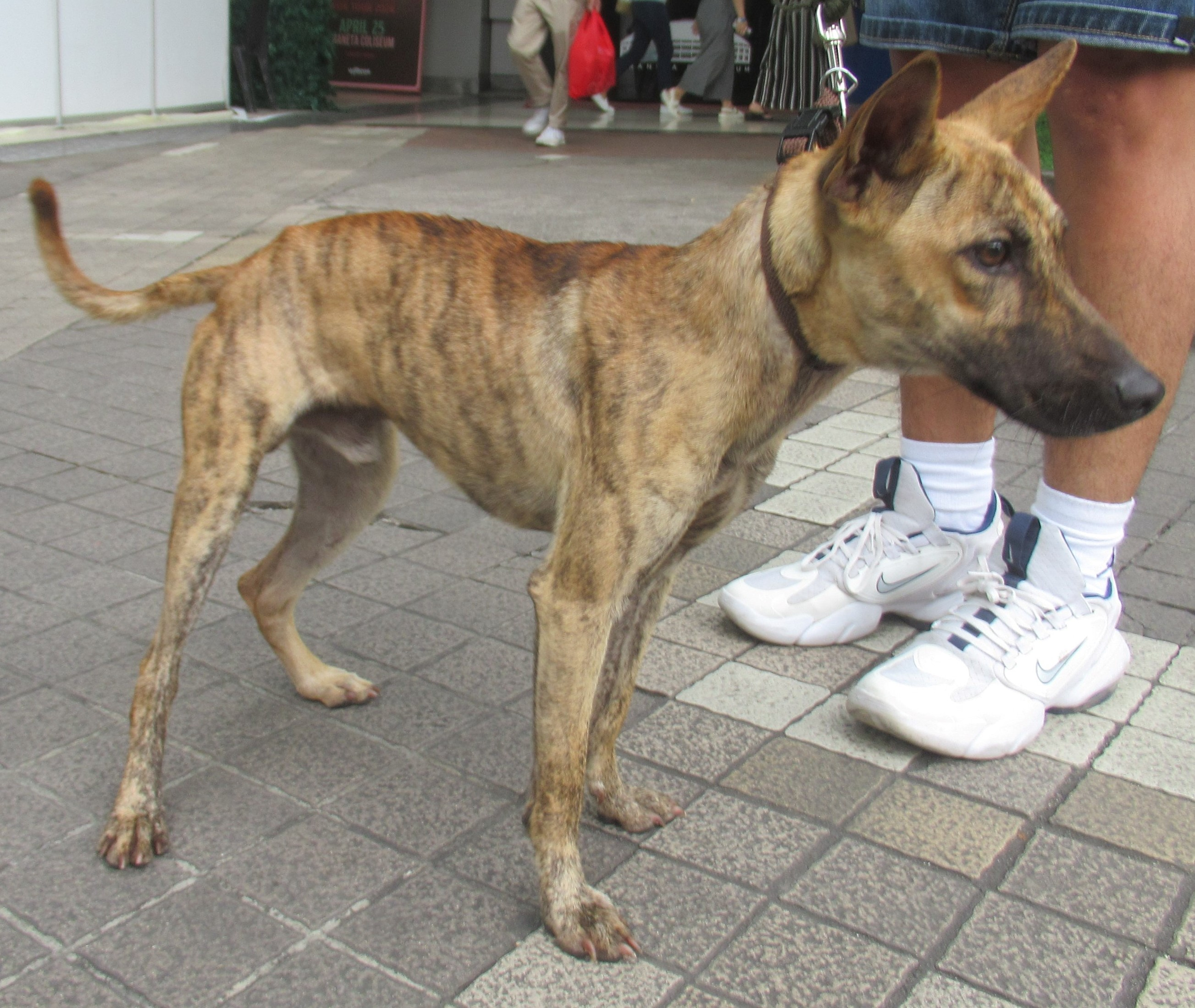
Philippine Forest Dog ("Asong Gubat”)

The Philippine Canine Club, Inc. formally introduced the Philippine Forest Dog or "Aso Ng Gubat", (i.e. Irog, Mayumi and Mutya) in the Philippine Circuit Show 2024 (January 17–21, 2024), Asia's biggest dog show at the Araneta Coliseum. The Club "hoped it will be the first dog breed from the Philippines that will be recognized by the Fédération Cynologique Internationale." "The Aso Ng Gubat is a primitive breed that has been formed through natural selection by its interaction with the environment so it's a purebred as compared to the Aspin or Askal which is a mongrel, and it has been living with indigenous Filipinos such as the Aetas and Negritos in the country's forests way before the Spaniards arrived," PCCI Corporate Secretary Fred Salud said.

== See also ==
- List of dog breeds
- Philippine Forest Dog
- Taiwan dog
- Polynesian dog
