= Gareth Jones (anatomist) =

New Zealand academic (born 1940)

Gareth Jones CNZM
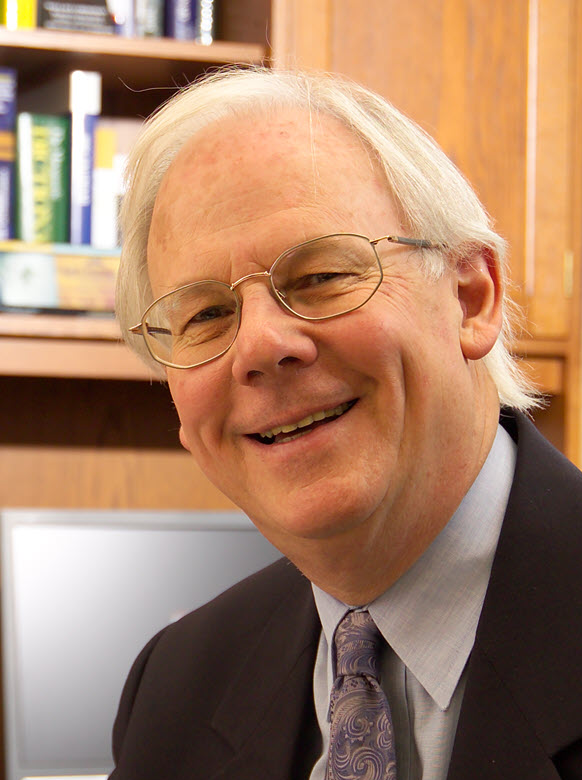
- Jones in 2005
- Born: 28 August 1940

Academic background
- Education: University College London, University of Western Australia

Academic work
- Institutions: University of Western Australia, University of Otago
- Doctoral students: Hallie Buckley

David Gareth Jones CNZM (born 28 August 1940) is a New Zealand academic, and is an emeritus professor at the University of Otago, specialising in neuroscience, bioethics and anatomical education. He has published a number of books, including a textbook on medical ethics, and several books on medicine and theology. In 2004 Jones was appointed a Companion of the New Zealand Order of Merit for services to science and education.

== Early life and education ==
Jones has a Bachelor of Science with Honours and a Bachelor of Medicine, Bachelor of Surgery, both from University College London. He also holds a Doctor of Science degree from the University of Western Australia, and an MD from the University of Otago.

== Academic career ==
Jones taught and studied at the University of Western Australia before joining the faculty of the University of Otago in 1983, as head of the Department of Anatomy and Structural Biology. He served four consecutive five-year terms in the role, ending in 2003. During his tenure he broadened the focus of the department from medical and dental students to include a greater proportion of science students, and strengthened the biomedical research focus of the department. Jones served as Deputy Vice Chancellor (Academic and International) for five years from the beginning of 2005, and was succeeded by Professor Vernon Squires. In 2008 he chaired the university's gender equity working party, which recommended the appointment of a gender equity leader.

Jones was Professor of Anatomy and Structural Biology. He was Director of the University of Otago Bioethics Centre. Jones specialises in neuroscience, bioethics and anatomical education, including topics such as stem cell research, genetic testing, the use of body parts in medical education, and abortion. He describes his research as "try[ing] to bridge the gap between science, research and policy issues." With two other Otago academics, Grant Gillett and Alastair Campbell, Jones wrote a widely-used textbook on medical ethics, which ran to four editions. Jones has also written on the relationship between science and faith. After his book Brave New People: Ethical issues at the commencement of life was published in 1984 there was considerable controversy, leading Jones to explore Christian approaches to dealing with controversial issues.

Jones was appointed emeritus professor at the University of Otago in 2012. He writes often for the Otago Daily Times on ethical and university issues.

One of Jones's notable doctoral students is Hallie Buckley.

== Recognition ==
In the 2004 Queen's Birthday Honours, Jones was appointed a Companion of the New Zealand Order of Merit for services to science and education.

== Selected works ==
=== Books ===
- Jones, David Gareth (2022). At the margins: A life in biomedical science, faith, and ethical dilemmas. Eugene: Resource Publications. ISBN 978-1-6667-4471-2. OCLC 1368161837. Wikidata Q136149131.
- Jones, David Gareth (2013). The Peril and Promise of Medical Technology. Oxford: Peter Lang. ISBN 978-3-0343-0775-8. OCLC 859744882. OL 28523500M. Wikidata Q136150301.
- Gareth Jones, R. John Elford (editors, 2010) A Glass Darkly: Medicine and theology in further dialogue. Peter Lang, Oxford, Bern. ISBN 978-3-03911-936-3
- Jones, David Gareth; Whitaker, Maja (2009). Speaking for the dead : the human body in biology and medicine. Aldershot: Ashgate Publishing. ISBN 978-0-7546-7452-8. OCLC 253188180. Wikidata Q136149908.
- R. John Elford, Gareth Jones (editors; 2009). A Tangled Web: Medicine and theology in dialogue. Peter Lang, Oxford, New York. ISBN 978-3-03911-541-9
- Alastair Campbell, Gareth Jones and Grant Gillett. (2005) Medical Ethics (4th edition). Oxford University Press. ISBN 0-19-558487-2
- Gareth Jones (2007). Bioethics: when the challenges of life become too difficult. ATF Press, Hindmarsh, South Australia. ISBN 978-1-920691-79-0
- Gareth Jones (2005). Designers of the Future: Who should make the decisions? Monarch Books, Oxford. ISBN 978-1-85424-708-7

=== Scholarly articles ===
- Jones, David Gareth (2024). "Finding an ethical framework for public dissections: The consent–context duality". Anatomical Sciences Education. 17 (7): 1509–1512. doi:10.1002/ase.2516. PMID 39228050. Wikidata Q137180287.
- Jones, David Gareth (2024). "Do religious and cultural considerations militate against body donation? An overview and a Christian perspective". Anatomical Sciences Education. 17 (8): 1586–1595. doi:10.1002/ase.2425. PMID 38634610. Wikidata Q137180288.
- Jones, David Gareth (2023). "Anatomists' uses of human skeletons: Ethical issues associated with the India bone trade and anonymized archival collections". Anatomical Sciences Education. 16 (4): 610–617. doi:10.1002/ase.2280. Wikidata Q137180286.
- Jones, David Gareth (2016). "The Artificial World of Plastination: A Challenge to Religious Perspectives on the Dead Human Body". The New Bioethics. 22 (3): 237–252. doi:10.1080/20502877.2016.1238580. PMID 28219268. Wikidata Q89319476.
- Jones, David Gareth; Whitaker, Maja (2011). "Anatomy's use of unclaimed bodies: reasons against continued dependence on an ethically dubious practice". Clinical Anatomy. 25 (2): 246–254. doi:10.1002/ca.21223. PMID 21800367. Wikidata Q50302912.
- Jones, David Gareth; Whitaker, Maja (2009). "Engaging with plastination and the Body Worlds phenomenon: a cultural and intellectual challenge for anatomists". Clinical Anatomy. 22 (6): 770–776. doi:10.1002/ca.20824. PMID 19585569. Wikidata Q49139043.
- Jones, David Gareth (1994). "Use of bequeathed and unclaimed bodies in the dissecting room". Clinical Anatomy. 7 (2): 102–107. doi:10.1002/ca.980070209. Wikidata Q137180280.
