= Rivers of New Zealand =

Overview of rivers in New Zealand

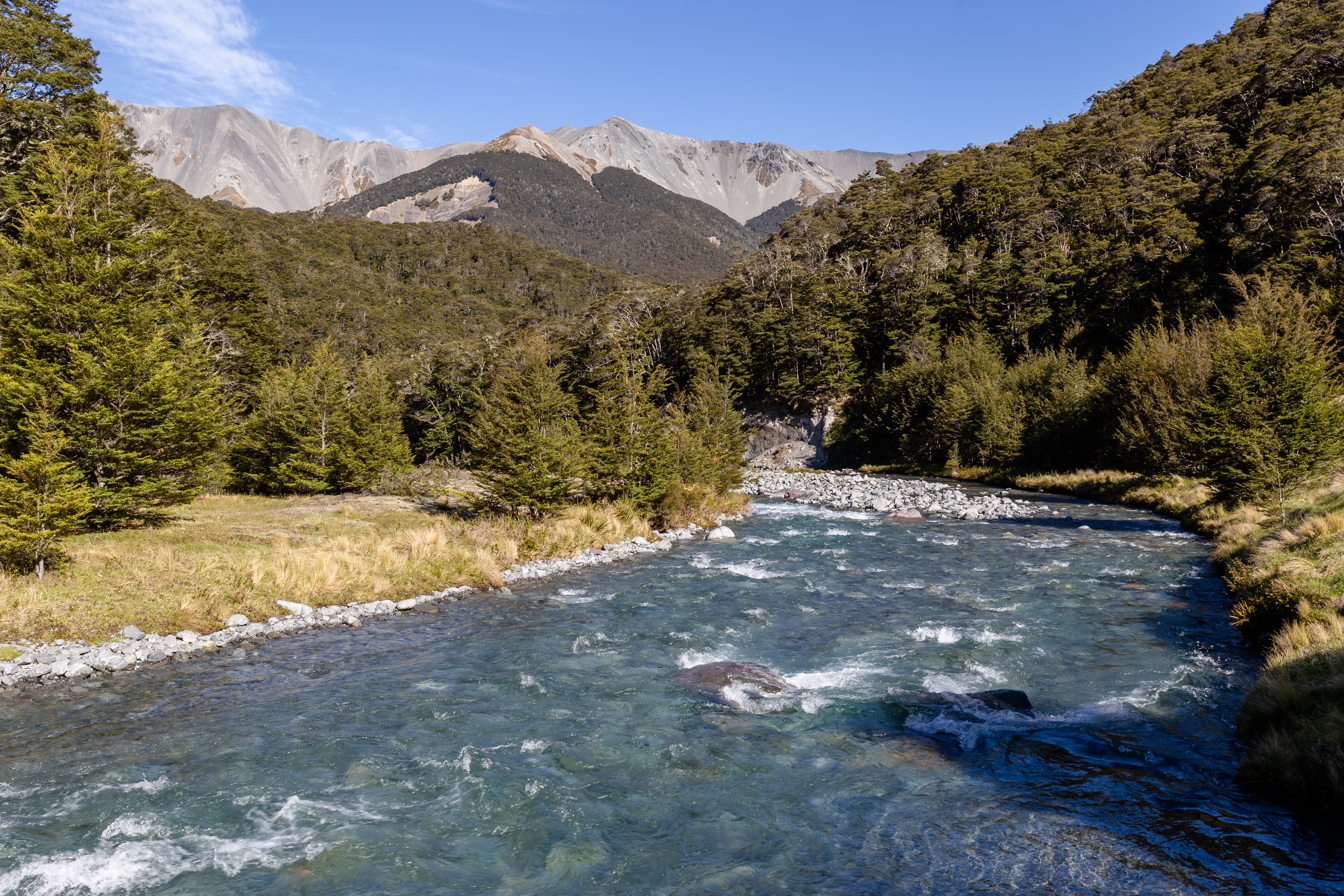
Harper River, Craigieburn Forest Park

The rivers of New Zealand are used for a variety of purposes and face a number of environmental issues. In the North Island's hill country they are deep, fast flowing and most are unnavigable. Many in the South Island are braided rivers. The navigable ones were used for mass transport in the country's early history.

== Statistics ==
The longest river in New Zealand is the Waikato River with a length of 425 kilometres (264 miles). The largest river by rate of flow is the Clutha River / Mata-Au with a mean discharge of 613 cubic metres per second (21,600 cu ft/s). The shortest river is claimed to be the Tūranganui River in Gisborne at 1,200 metres (3,900 feet) long.

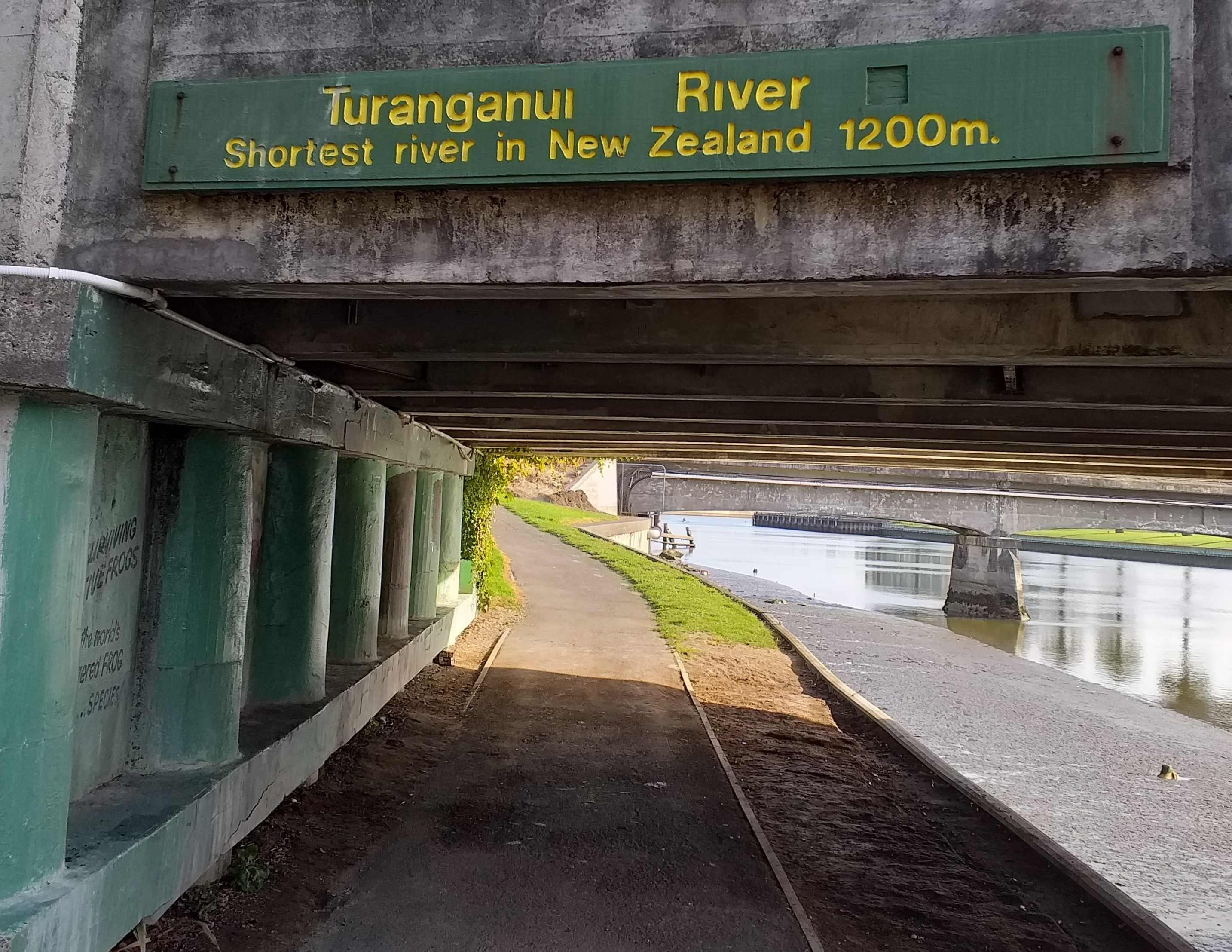
Tūranganui river sign

Some of the rivers, especially those with wide flood plains and stop banks, have long road bridges spanning them. The Rakaia River is crossed by Rakaia Bridge, the longest bridge in New Zealand at 1,757 m (5,764 ft). The third longest bridge is the Whirokino Trestle Bridge on State Highway 1 crossing the Manawatū River.

Over 180,000 km (110,000 mi) of rivers have been mapped in New Zealand.

== Uses ==
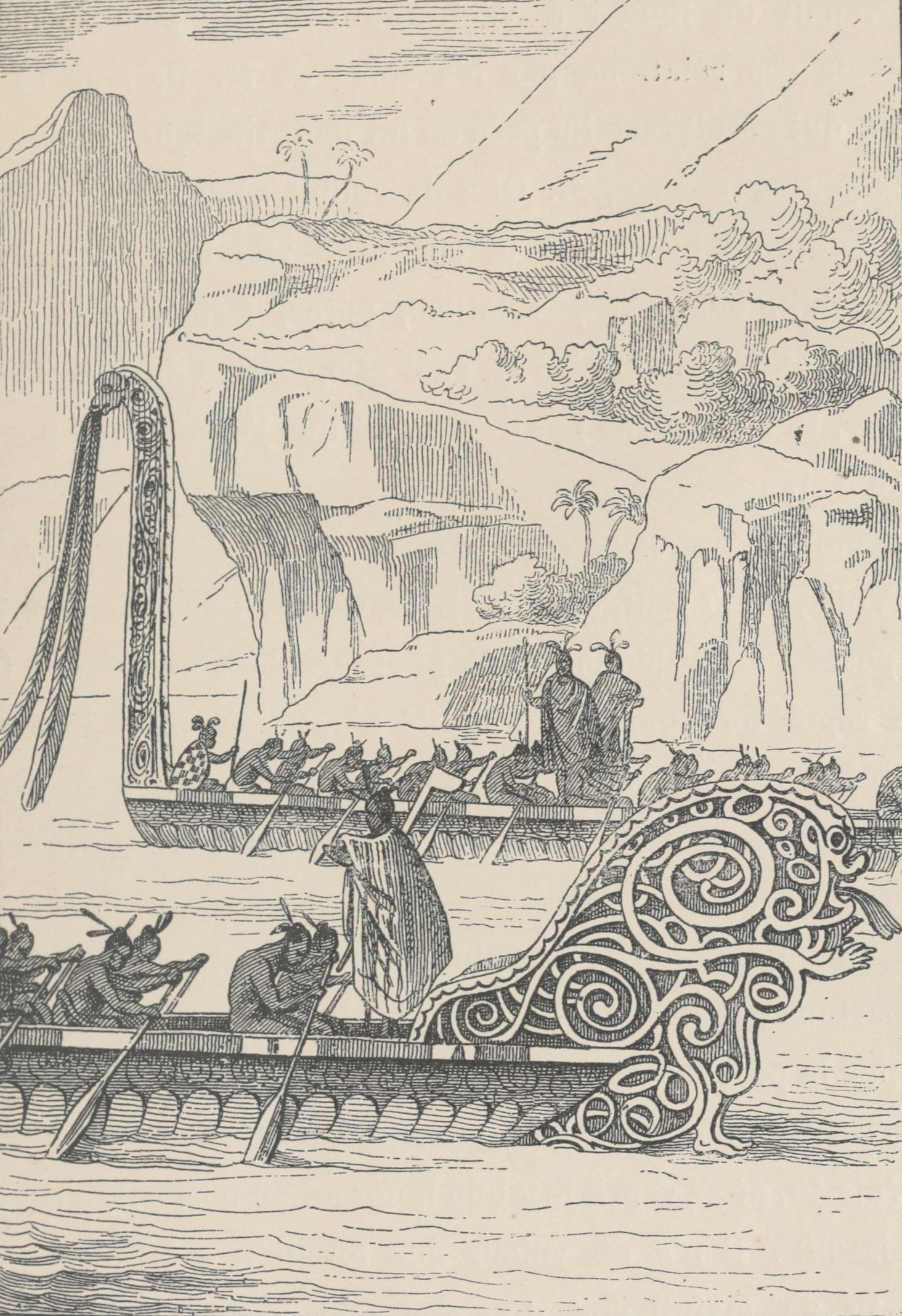
Māori waka

Before colonisation, Māori frequently used the navigable rivers (waterways) for transportation. Waka (canoes) made of hollowed-out logs were the main mode of navigating rivers. During the early European settler years, coastal shipping was one of the main methods of transportation. There are 1,609 km (1,000 mi) of navigable inland waterways which are no longer significant transport routes.

Rivers are used for commercial tourism and recreation activities such as rafting, canoeing, kayaking and jet-boating. Bungy jumping, pioneered as a commercial venture by a New Zealand innovator, is often done above some of the more scenic rivers.

Over half of the electricity generated in New Zealand is hydroelectric power. Hydroelectric power stations have been constructed on many rivers, some of which dam the river completely while others channel a portion of the water through the power station. Some of the large hydroelectric power schemes in both North Island and South Island use a system of canals to move water between catchments in order to maximise electricity generation.

== Conservation and pollution ==
River conservation is threatened by pollution inflows from point and non-point sources. In the past rivers had been used for pollution discharges from factories and municipal sewerage plants. With increasing environmental awareness and the passing of the Resource Management Act 1991, these sources of pollution are now less problematic. Water abstraction, especially for irrigation, is now a major threat to the character of rivers. An upsurge in conversion of land to dairy farming is stretching water resources. Also, since dairy farming is becoming more intensified in New Zealand and requires large amounts of water, the problem is therefore being exacerbated.

Acid mine drainage (AMD) from the Stockton coal mine has altered the ecology of the Mangatini Stream on the West Coast. The Stockton mine is also leaching AMD into the Waimangaroa River and the proposed Cypress Mine will increase this amount.

There is a high level of pollution in lowland rivers and streams that flow through urban or pastoral farming areas.

A report from the Ministry of Economic Development identified a large number of rivers as being suitable for hydroelectric power production. This report alarmed the Green Party and a number of environmental organisations due to the fear of an increasing loss of scenic rivers and rivers that have a high degree of natural character.

== See also ==
- Water in New Zealand
- Environment of New Zealand
- Water conservation orders in New Zealand
- Lakes of New Zealand
- Bridges in New Zealand
- New Zealand Hydrological Society
