= Polynesian Dog =

Several extinct domestic dog varieties

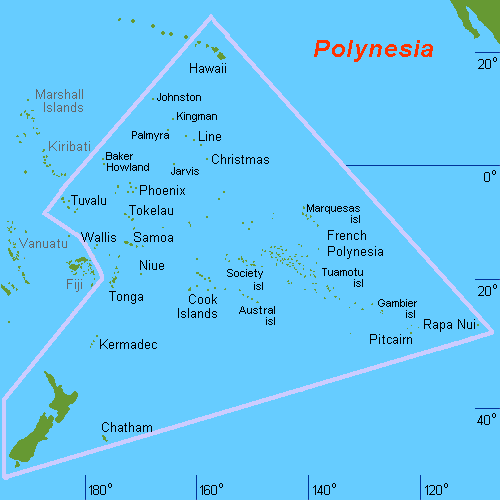
Geographic definition of Polynesia

The Polynesian Dog refers to a few extinct varieties of domesticated dogs from the islands of Polynesia. These dogs were used for both companionship and food and were introduced alongside poultry and pigs to various islands. They became extinct as a result of the crossbreeding that occurred after European breeds of dogs were introduced. Modern studies done on the DNA of the Polynesian dogs indicate that they descended from the domesticated dogs of Southeast Asia and may have shared a remote ancestor with the dingo.

== Taxonomy ==
In 1839, the British naturalist Charles Hamilton Smith gave this dog the scientific name of Canis pacificus in his 1840 book The Natural History of Dogs: Canidae Or Genus Canis of Authors; Including Also the Genera Hyaena and Proteles. In the third edition of Mammal Species of the World published in 2005, the mammalogist W. Christopher Wozencraft listed under the wolf Canis lupus the taxon "familiaris Linnaeus, 1758 [domestic dog]". Wozencraft then listed Canis pacificus C. E. H. Smith, 1839 as junior taxonomic synonym for the domestic dog.

== History and distribution ==
These dogs were introduced by the ancestors of the Polynesian people during their settlement of the far-flung islands, with a few major archipelagos developing isolated breeds.

Notable breeds include:

- Hawaiian Poi Dog – introduced to the Hawaiian Islands
- Kurī – introduced to New Zealand
- Marquesan Dog – introduced to the Marquesas Islands
- Tahitian Dog – introduced to the Society Islands
  - Tuamotuan Dog – introduced to the Tuamotus, this may have been a longer-haired version of the Tahitian Dog. Described by British naturalist Georg Forster.

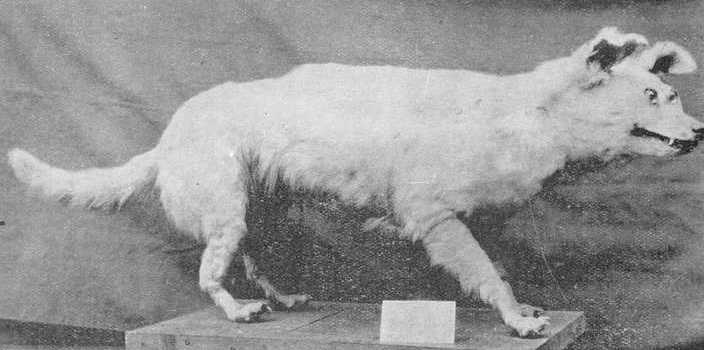
Kurī specimen, Museum of New Zealand Te Papa Tongarewa, 1924

The distribution of Polynesian dogs on other islands was somewhat patchy. Islands like Mangareva, Tokelau and the Marquesas possessed domesticated dog populations after initial settlement that went extinct before the arrival of European explorers. On Easter Island, no evidence or traces of dogs have been found in middens around the island or in the oral tradition of the Rapa Nui people. They were virtually absent from Western Polynesia (i.e., Samoa and Tonga) by the time Europeans arrived. However, dogs brought on European ships were recognized by the natives when they were introduced as items of trade, indicating a universal cultural recognition of dogs across the islands. While Māori brought dogs to New Zealand, the Moriori had no dogs in the Chatham Islands at the time of European arrival.

== Relationship to humans ==
The Polynesians raised dogs for companionship and food. Along with domesticated pigs and chickens, dog meat was an important animal protein source for the human populations of Polynesia. For the most part, they were fed a vegetarian diet of either breadfruits, coconuts, yams or poi made from taro, while the larger Kurī predominantly subsisted on a diet of fish.

They never became feral because of the scarcity of food in the native forests. The diet and environment of the islands resulted in a dog with small stature and a docile disposition, and European explorers described them as lazy. They were said to rarely bark, but would howl occasionally.

The distinct breeds of the Polynesian Dog became extinct between the 19th and early 20th centuries due to interbreeding with introduced European dog breeds; the declining consumption of dog meat was another contributing factor.

== In mythology ==
Dogs were an important part of the Polynesian narrative. They are often associated with the legendary exploits of the demigod Māui. According to Māori narrative, Māui transformed his brother-in-law Irawaru, husband of Hina, into the first dog, which was used to explain the human characteristics of dogs. In the Tongan narrative, Maui-Atalaga and his son/brother Maui-Kijikiji attempted to hunt down Fulububuta, an enormous man-eating dog, larger than a horse, living in a cave on the Fijian island of Moturiki. However, Atalaga is killed and dragged into a cave by the monster, which is later slain by Maui-Kijikiji, who wastes away mourning his dead father.

== Genetic studies ==
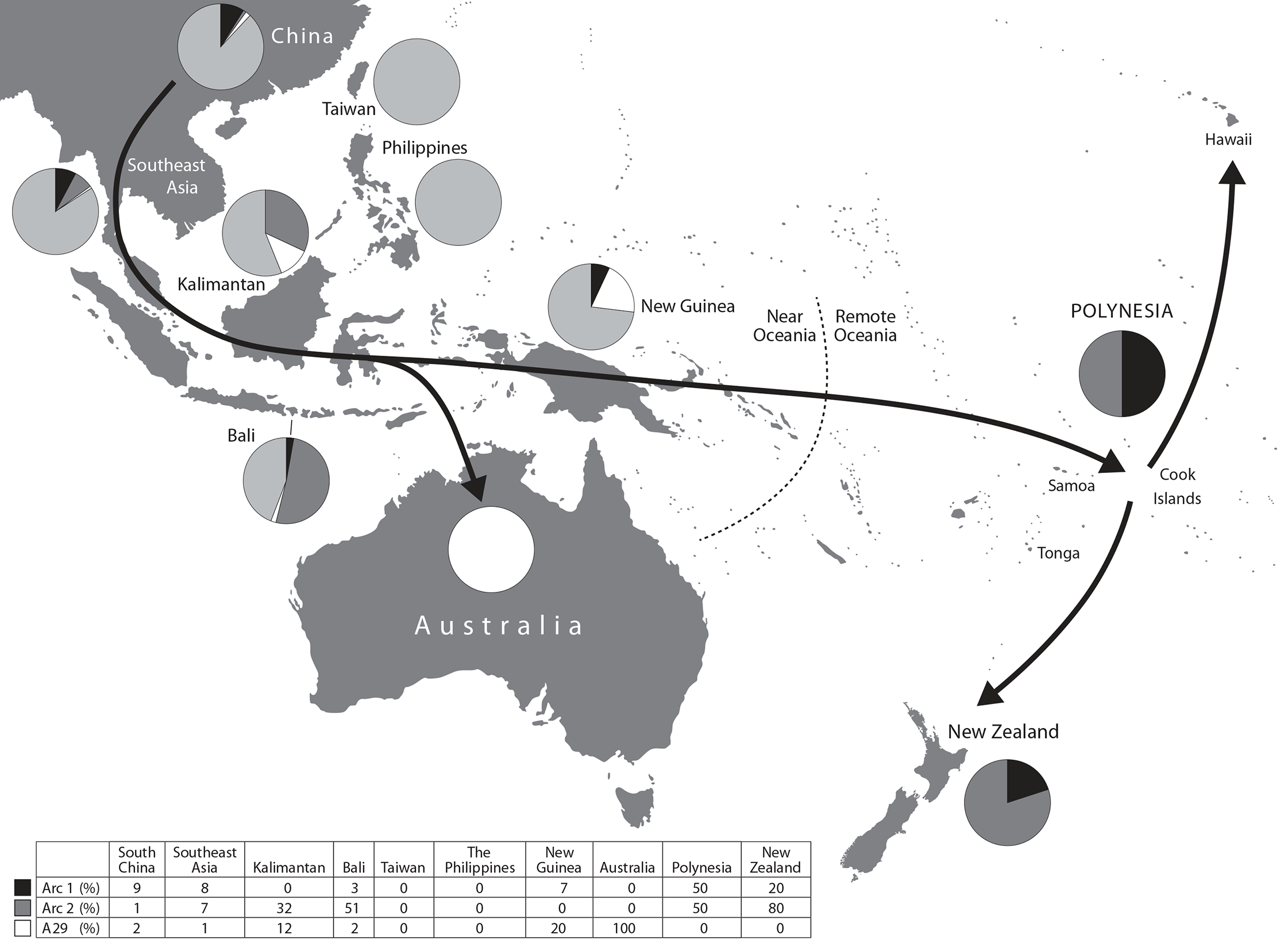
Proposed route for the migration of dogs based on mDNA. Haplotype A29 relates most to the Australian Dingo and the New Guinea Singing Dog, the ancient Polynesian Arc2 to modern Polynesian, Indonesian and ancient New Zealand dogs, and the ancient Polynesian Arc1 is indistinguishable from a number of widespread modern haplotypes.

DNA evidence indicates that Polynesian dogs descended from the domesticated dogs of Southeast Asia and may have shared a remote ancestor with the dingo. The study of mtDNA show they carried two haplotypes: Arc1 and Arc2.

In 2011, the mDNA of dogs from the Malay Peninsula found that the two most common dog haplotypes of the Indonesian region, in particular Bali and Kalimantan, were mDNA haplotype A75 (40%) and "the dingo founder haplotype" A29 (8%). Also present were haplotypes A120 and A145. All 4 haplotypes fall within the a2 mDNA sub-haplogroup. The study also looked at archaeological specimens of ancient Polynesian dogs from which only a "short-haplotype" (a short sequence) could be derived. This short haplotype was named Arc2 and corresponds to mDNA haplotypes A75 and A120, and it could be found in 70% of samples found as far away as Hawaii and New Zealand. No dogs from Taiwan nor the Philippines carried the dingo or Polynesian haplotypes, which indicates that dogs did not enter the Pacific from a northeastern route.

In 2015, a study looked at the mDNA sequences taken from ancient New Zealand Kurī dog samples discovered at an archaeological site at Wairau Bar and found they correspond to the a2 mDNA sub-haplogroup. The dog samples all carried the mDNA haplotype A192, which has only been reported in some modern village dogs from Bali, Indonesia. When compared with the two ancient Polynesian haplotypes Arc1 and Arc2, all of the Wairau Bar dogs matched Arc2. Dogs from Wairau Bar likely represent part of the initial population of dogs introduced to New Zealand, having arrived with people around the beginning of the fourteenth century.

All of these dogs carry haplotypes that fall under the mDNA a2 sub-haplogroup and are therefore descendants of a dog/Chinese wolf hybrid ancestor. In 2015, the most comprehensive study of mDNA haplotypes to date found that the a2 sub-haplogroup represents 3% of all dogs in Southeast Asia, 22% in the Indian subcontinent and 16% in East Asia.

=== Dogs enter Oceania from southern China ===
In 2020, an mDNA study of ancient dog fossils from the Yellow River and Yangtze River basins of southern China showed that most of the ancient dogs fell within mDNA haplogroup A1b, as do the Australian dingoes and the pre-colonial dogs of the Pacific, but in low frequency in China today. The specimen from the Tianluoshan archaeological site, Zhejiang province dates to 7,000 YBP and is basal to the entire lineage. The dogs belonging to this haplogroup were once widely distributed in southern China, then dispersed through Southeast Asia into New Guinea and Oceania, but were replaced in China 2,000 YBP by dogs of other lineages.

== See also ==
- Hawaiian Poi Dog, an extinct breed of pariah dog from Hawaiʻi
- Askal
- Taiwan dog
- Philippine forest dog
- Domesticated plants and animals of Austronesia

== Bibliography ==
- "Canis pacificus". IBIS-Mammals.
- Diamond, Jared M. (1997). Guns, Germs, and Steel: The Fates of Human Societies. New York: W. W. Norton. ISBN 978-0-393-03891-0. OCLC 60820242.
- Duleba, Anna; Skonieczna, Katarzyna; Bogdanowicz, Wiesław; Malyarchuk, Boris; Grzybowski, Tomasz (2015). "Complete mitochondrial genome database and standardized classification system for Canis lupus familiaris". Forensic Science International: Genetics. 19: 123–129. doi:10.1016/j.fsigen.2015.06.014. PMID 26218982.
- Greig, Karen; Boocock, James; Prost, Stefan; Horsburgh, K. Ann; Jacomb, Chris; Walter, Richard; Matisoo-Smith, Elizabeth (2015). "Complete Mitochondrial Genomes of New Zealand's First Dogs". PLoS ONE. 10 (10) e0138536. Bibcode:2015PLoSO..1038536G. doi:10.1371/journal.pone.0138536. PMC 4596854. PMID 26444283.
- Greig, Karen; Walter, Richard; Matisoo-Smith, Elizabeth A. (2015). "Dogs and people in Southeast Asia and the Pacific". In M. Oxenham & H. Buckley (ed.). The Routledge Handbook of Bioarchaeology in Southeast Asia and the Pacific Islands. Abingdon, UK: Routledge. pp. 462–482. ISBN 978-1-317-53401-3.
- Greig, K; Walter, R; Matisoo-Smith, L (2016). Marc Oxenham; Hallie Buckley (eds.). The Routledge Handbook of Bioarchaeology in Southeast Asia and the Pacific Islands. Oxford UK: Routledge. pp. 471–475. ISBN 978-1-138-77818-4.
- Haun, Beverley (2008). Inventing 'Easter Island'. Toronto: University of Toronto Press. ISBN 978-0-8020-9888-7. OCLC 166687891.
- Luomala, Katharine (July 1960). "A History of the Binomial Classification of the Polynesian Native Dog" (PDF). Pacific Science. 14 (13). Honolulu: University of Hawaii Press / Pacific Science Association: 193–223. hdl:10125/8347. OCLC 78130351.
- Luomala, Katharine (1949). Maui-of-a-thousand-tricks: His Oceanic and European Biographers. Honolulu: Bernice P. Bishop Museum. ISBN 978-0-527-02306-5. OCLC 16792306.
- Luomala, Katharine (1958). "Polynesian Myths about Maui and the Dog". Fabula. 2 (1). Berlin: Walter de Gruyter: 139–162. doi:10.1515/fabl.1959.2.1.139. OCLC 4958364642. S2CID 161088509.
- Millerstrom, Sidsel N. (2003). "Facts and Fantasies: the Archaeology of the Marquesan Dog". In Sharyn Jones O'Day; Wim Van Neer; A. Ervynck (eds.). Behaviour Behind Bones: The Zooarchaeology of Ritual, Religion, Status and Identity. Vol. 1. Oxford: Oxbow Book. ISBN 978-1-78297-913-5. OCLC 891457752.
- Pang, J.-F.; Kluetsch, C.; Zou, X.-J.; Zhang, A.-B.; Luo, L.-Y.; Angleby, H.; Ardalan, A.; Ekstrom, C.; Skollermo, A.; Lundeberg, J.; Matsumura, S.; Leitner, T.; Zhang, Y.-P.; Savolainen, P. (2009). "MtDNA Data Indicate a Single Origin for Dogs South of Yangtze River, Less Than 16,300 Years Ago, from Numerous Wolves". Molecular Biology and Evolution. 26 (12): 2849–64. doi:10.1093/molbev/msp195. PMC 2775109. PMID 19723671.
- Oskarsson, M. C. R.; Klutsch, C. F. C.; Boonyaprakob, U.; Wilton, A.; Tanabe, Y.; Savolainen, P. (2011). "Mitochondrial DNA data indicate an introduction through Mainland Southeast Asia for Australian dingoes and Polynesian domestic dogs". Proceedings of the Royal Society B: Biological Sciences. 279 (1730): 967–974. doi:10.1098/rspb.2011.1395. PMC 3259930. PMID 21900326.
- Titcomb, Margaret; Pukui, Mary Kawena (1969). Dog and Man in the Ancient Pacific, with Special Attention to Hawaii. Vol. 59. Honolulu, Hawaii: Bernice P. Bishop Museum Special Publications. pp. 1–48. OCLC 925631874.
- Sharp, Andrew (1964). Ancient Voyagers in Polynesia. University of California Press. pp. 120–. GGKEY:XL03UTGXNLD.
- Smith, Bradley (2015). The Dingo Debate: Origins, Behaviour and Conservation. Melbourne: CSIRO Publishing. ISBN 978-1-4863-0030-3.
- Smith, Charles Hamilton (1840). The Natural History of Dogs: Canidae Or Genus Canis of Authors; Including Also the Genera Hyaena and Proteles. Edinburgh: W. H. Lizars. OCLC 860931.
- Worthy, T. H.; Holdaway, Richard N. (2002). The Lost World of the Moa: Prehistoric Life of New Zealand. Bloomington, IN: Indiana University Press. ISBN 0-253-34034-9. OCLC 248051318.
- Zhang, Ming; Sun, Guoping; Ren, Lele; Yuan, Haibing; Dong, Guanghui; Zhang, Lizhao; Liu, Feng; Cao, Peng; Ko, Albert Min-Shan; Yang, Melinda A.; Hu, Songmei; Wang, Guo-Dong; Fu, Qiaomei (2020). "Ancient DNA evidence from China reveals the expansion of Pacific dogs". Molecular Biology and Evolution. 37 (5): 1462–1469. doi:10.1093/molbev/msz311. PMC 7182212. PMID 31913480.
