= Soren Holm =

Bioethicist

Søren Holm is a bioethicist and philosopher of medicine. He holds a chair in bioethics at the Centre for Social Ethics and Policy, part of the School of Law at the University of Manchester in Great Britain and the University of Oslo. With Professor John Harris Holm served as co-Editor in Chief of the Journal of Medical Ethics from 2004-2011. Holm holds a master's degree in health care ethics from the University of Manchester and two doctoral degrees in medical ethics from the University of Copenhagen. He was a member of the Nuffield Council on Bioethics from 2006 to 2012 and a member of the Council’s Working Party on Emerging biotechnologies (published autumn 2012).

Holm and John Harris co-authored a seminal paper in Nature that challenged the value of the precautionary principle in modern scientific research.

Together with researchers Bjørn Hofmann (NTNU) and Anne I. Myhr (UiT) he conducted a study in 2010-2011 among PhD students at Norwegian medical faculties to investigate their attitudes toward scientific dishonesty. The conclusions of the study attracted wide attention. For example, 10 per cent of the students considered it acceptable to falsify or fabricate data, and 10 per cent to report experimental data without having conducted the experiment. The findings were published in BMC Medical Ethics and other journals.

== Bibliography ==
- Analogical Reasoning in Handling Emerging Technologies: The Case of Umbilical Cord Blood Biobanking, Hofmann B, Solbakk JH and Holm S, The American Journal of Bioethics, 6 (6) (2006) 49-57
- Embryonic stem cell research and the moral status of human embryos, Holm S, Reproductive Biomedicine Online, 10 (Sup 1) (2005) 63-67
- Informed Consent and the Bio-banking of Material from Children, Holm S, Genomics, Society and Policy, 1 (1) (2005) 16-26
- Like a Frog in Boiling Water: The Public, The HFEA and Sex Selection, Holm S, Health Care Analysis, 12 (1) (2004) 27-39 ISSN 1065-3058
- Medical Aid in Disaster Relief, Holm S, Principles of Health Care Ethics, 2 ed. (Editors RE Ashcroft, A Dawson, H Draper, JR McMillan), Wiley, Chichester (2007), 671-677 ISBN 978-0-470-02713-4
- Conducting Research in the Alzheimer Disease Population: Balancing Individual, Group, Family and Societal Interests,Holm S, Ethical Foundations of Palliative Care for Alzheimer Disease (Editors Purtillo, Ruth & ten Have, Henk AMJ), The Johns Hopkins University Press, Baltimore (2004), 320-329
