= Lakes of New Zealand =

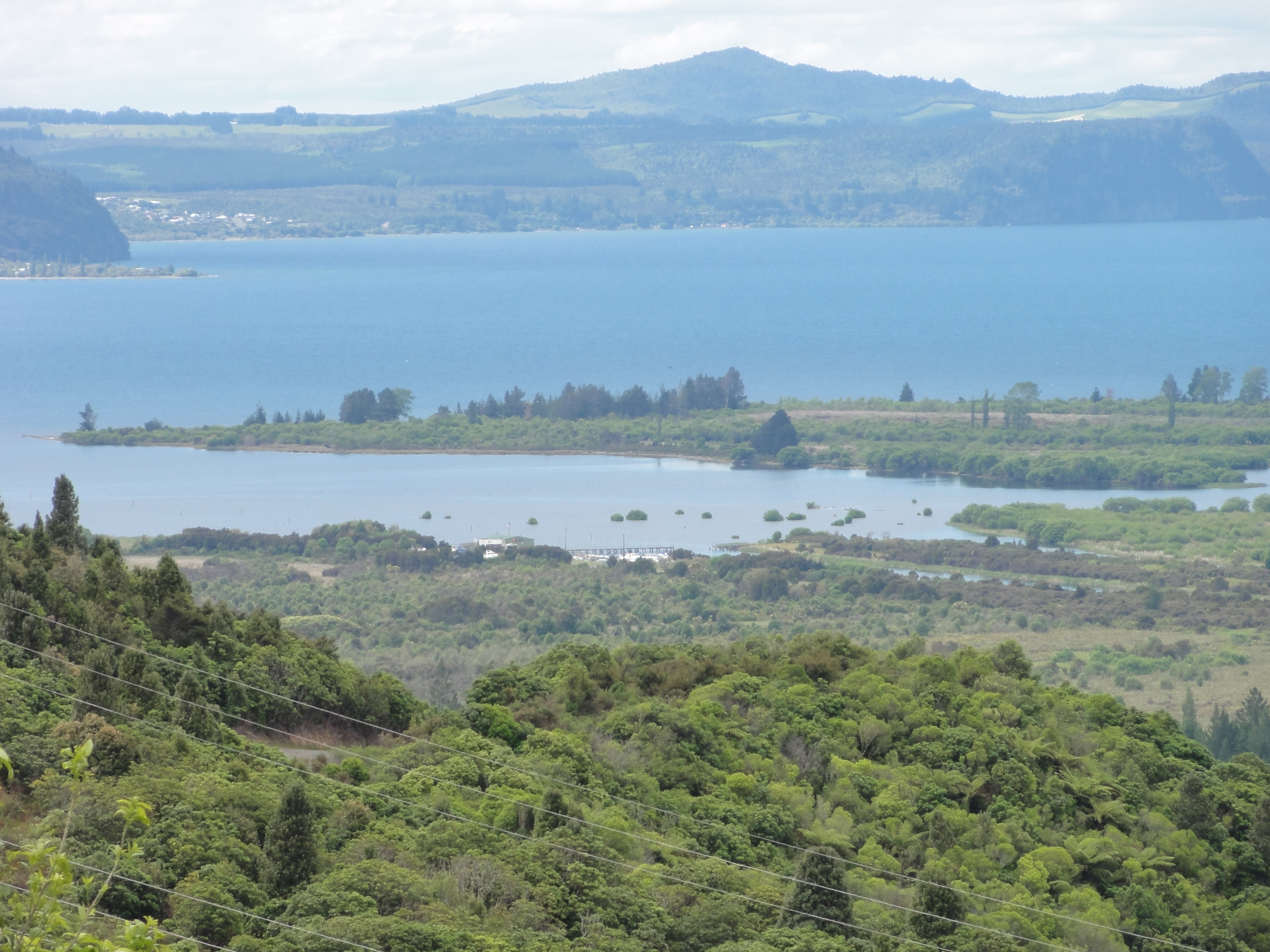
Lake Taupō, the largest lake

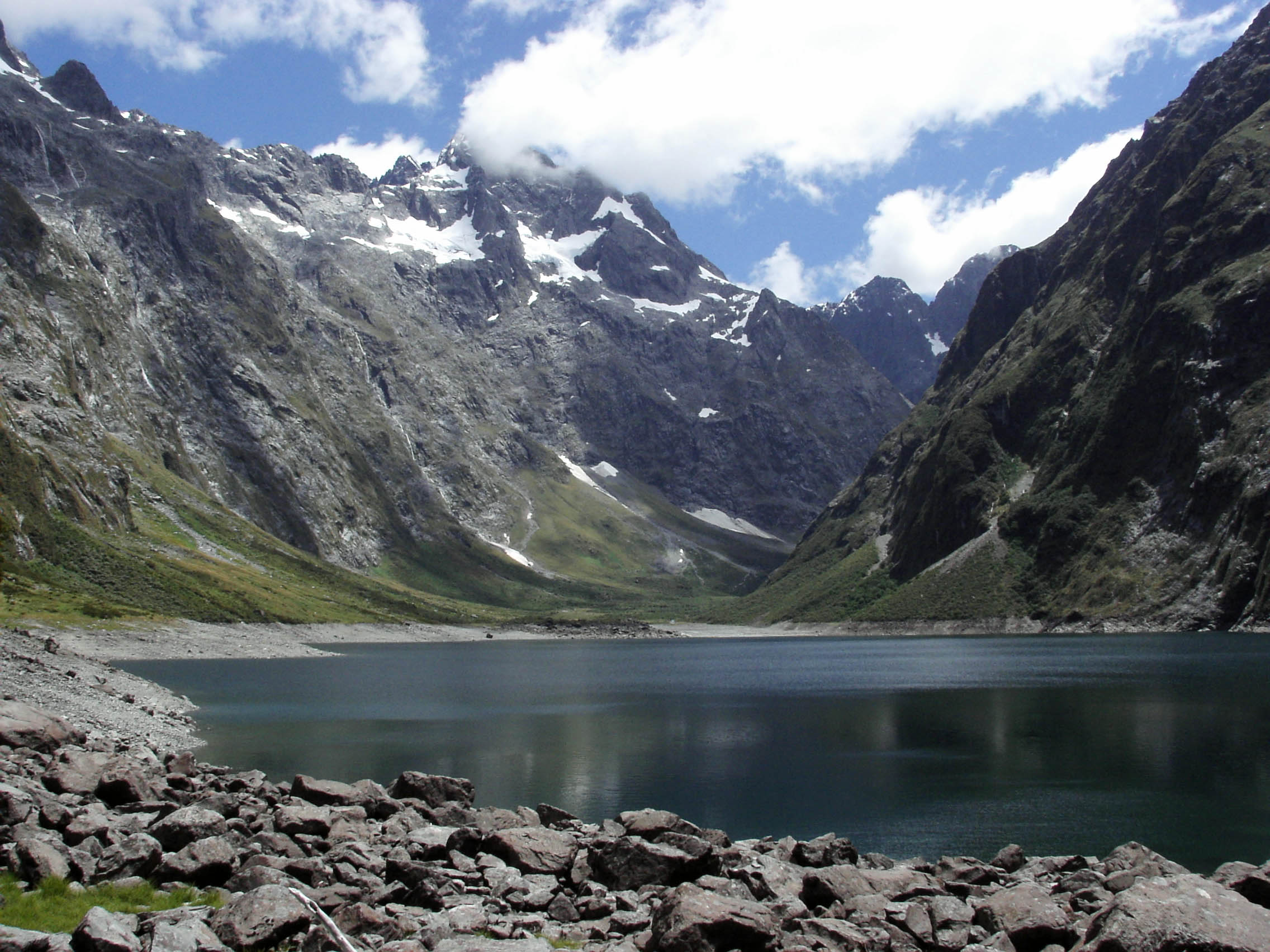
Lake Marian in Fiordland National Park

There are 3,820 lakes in New Zealand that have a surface area larger than one hectare. Many of the lakes in the central North Island are volcanic crater lakes. The majority of the lakes near the Southern Alps were carved by glaciers. Artificial lakes created as hydroelectric reservoirs are common in South Canterbury, Central Otago and along the Waikato River.

== Statistics ==
- Largest lake: Lake Taupō – 616 km^{2} (238 sq mi)
- Deepest lake: Lake Hauroko – 462 m

There are:

- 41 lakes with a surface area larger than 10 km^{2} (1000 ha)
- 229 lakes greater than 0.5 km^{2} (50 ha)
- 3820 lakes greater than 0.01 km^{2} (1 ha)

== Pollution ==
A trophic level index is used as a measure of the pollution levels of lakes in New Zealand.

Based on the monitoring of 134 lakes it is estimated that one third of New Zealand lakes have high nutrient levels or have poor water quality.

== See also ==
- Rivers of New Zealand
- Water in New Zealand
- List of lagoons of New Zealand
- List of dams and reservoirs in New Zealand
- Environment of New Zealand
