= Brian Lynch =

Brian Lynch may refer to:

- Brian Lynch (basketball) (born 1978), American basketball player
- Brian Lynch (musician) (born 1956), American jazz trumpeter
- Brian Lynch (public servant) (born 1936), New Zealander public servant
- Brian Lynch (American writer) (born 1973), American film and comic book writer
- Brian Lynch (Irish writer) (born 1945), Irish writer of poetry, plays, and fiction
