= Coastline of New Zealand =

The New Zealand coastline.

New Zealand has 15,000 kilometres (9,300 mi) of coastline making it the 9th longest in the world. The coastline borders the Tasman Sea and the Pacific Ocean. The northern and southernmost points of the coastline on the two main islands are Surville Cliffs and Slope Point respectively.

Cape Reinga in the north and Bluff in the south are often incorrectly given as the extremities of the coastline on the North and South Islands. Coastal development, such as buildings and marine farms, has become contentious in recent decades.

== Geography ==
The geography of the New Zealand coastline is varied. As well as sheltered sandy beaches there are rugged, remote and cliff lined sections typified by the Fiordland area. Ironsand gives the beaches on west coast of the North Island a black colouration.

Pine plantation were established on some of the coastal dune sections. Woodhill, Riverhead and Bottle Lake Forest are such examples. Marram grass was planted for dune stabilisation displacing native plants such as Pingao.

== Coastal fortifications ==
Coastal fortifications were built around the New Zealand coast line in two separate times: in 1885 during the "Russian scare" and during World War II as a defence against the perceived threat of a Japanese invasion. Some of the installations have been restored and are open to the public.

== See also ==
- New Zealand foreshore and seabed controversy
- Marine and Coastal Area (Takutai Moana) Act 2011
- Water in New Zealand
- Environment of New Zealand
