= Brett Delahunt =

New Zealand pathologist

Brett Delahunt ONZM KStJ FRSNZ
- Born: 20 February 1950 (age 76); Wellington, New Zealand
- Spouse: Susan Anne Kirk (m. 1990)
- Awards: Hercus Medal
- Scientific career
- Fields: Pathology, molecular medicine
- Institutions: University of Otago

Brett Delahunt ONZM KStJ FRSNZ (born 20 February 1950) is a New Zealand professor emeritus of pathology and molecular medicine at the Wellington School of Medicine. He is an expert in urological pathology.

== Early life and family ==
Born in Wellington on 20 February 1950, Delahunt was educated at Scots College. He studied at Victoria University of Wellington from 1969 to 1972, graduating BSc(Hons), and then at the University of Otago from 1973 to 1978, where he completed a BMedSc in 1976 and MB ChB in 1978.

In 1990, Delahunt married Sarah Anne Kirk.

== Honours and awards ==
- Officer of the New Zealand Order of Merit (ONZM) for services to pathology, 2004 Queen's Birthday Honours
- Knight of the Order of St John, 1995
- In 2018, he was awarded the Hercus Medal of the Royal Society of New Zealand as a result of his "internationally recognised contributions as a pathologist, especially in relation to kidney and prostate cancer."
- Fellow Royal Society of New Zealand, 2012
