= Trevor Malloch =

New Zealand cricketer (1928–2020)

Trevor Malloch QSM
Personal information
- Full name: Trevor Stuart Malloch
- Born: 2 December 1928; Wellington, New Zealand
- Died: 5 November 2020 (aged 91); Feilding, New Zealand
- Batting: Right-handed
- Bowling: Right-arm fast-medium

Domestic team information
- Years: Team
- 1953/54: Wellington

Career statistics
Competition	First-class
Matches	2
Runs scored	19
Batting average	9.50
100s/50s	0/0
Top score	12
Balls bowled	432
Wickets	6
Bowling average	30.33
5 wickets in innings	0
10 wickets in match	0
Best bowling	2/59
Catches/stumpings	1/0
- Source: Cricinfo, 5 November 2020

Trevor Stuart Malloch QSM (2 December 1928 – 2 November 2020) was a New Zealand cricketer. He played in two first-class matches for Wellington in 1953/54.

As a golfer, Malloch won the Manawatū Golf Club championship, and he was awarded life membership of the New Zealand Golf Association and the New Zealand Sports Turf Institute. He was also active in local community affairs, and served as chair of the Central Energy Trust and the Palmerston North Hospital Board. In the 2004 Queen's Birthday Honours, he was awarded the Queen's Service Medal for public services.

Malloch died in Feilding on 2 November 2020, at the age of 91, and was the oldest player for Wellington at the time of his death.

== See also ==
- List of Wellington representative cricketers
