= 2004 Birthday Honours (New Zealand) =

Awards list for New Zealand

2004 Queen's Birthday Honours
- Previous: 2004 New Year Honours; Next: 2005 New Year Honours
- Type: New Zealand royal honours: New Zealand Order of Merit; Queen's Service Order; Queen's Service Medal
- Date: 7 June 2004
- Country: New Zealand

Highlights
- Total recipients: 189

The 2004 Queen's Birthday Honours in New Zealand, celebrating the official birthday of Queen Elizabeth II, were appointments made by the Queen in her right as Queen of New Zealand, on the advice of the New Zealand government, to various orders and honours to reward and highlight good works by New Zealanders. They were announced on 7 June 2004.

The recipients of honours are listed here as they were styled before their new honour.

== New Zealand Order of Merit ==
=== Distinguished Companion (DCNZM) ===
- The Honourable Noel Crossley Anderson – of Auckland. For services to the judiciary.
- Associate Professor Witi Tame Ihimaera Smiler QSM – of Auckland. For services to literature.
- Oswald George James OBE – of Hamilton. For services to aviation and the community.
- The Right Reverend Dr Penelope Ann Bansall Jamieson – of Dunedin. For services to the community.
- Lois Joan Muir OBE – of Dunedin. For services to sports administration and netball.
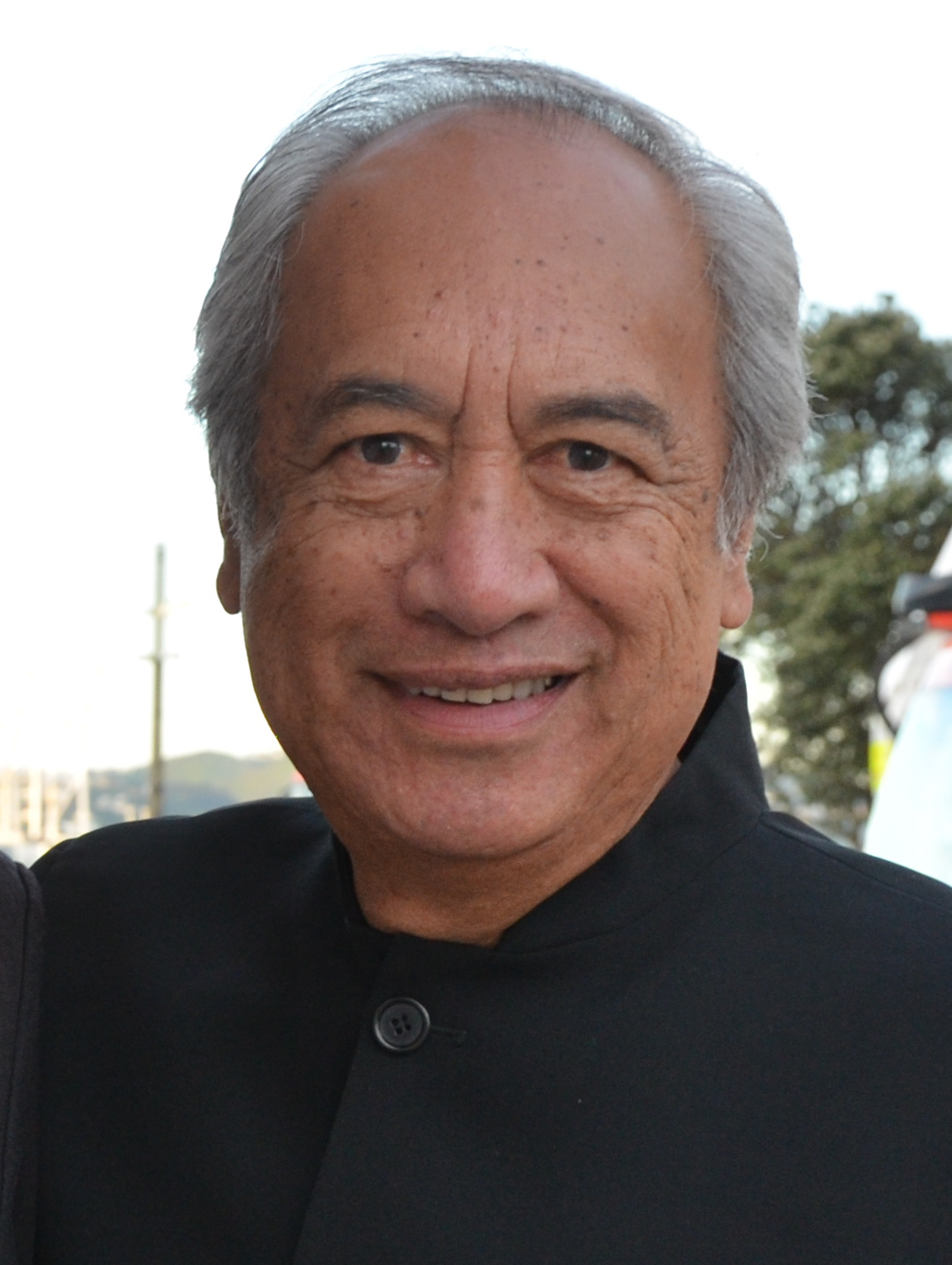
Witi Ihimaera

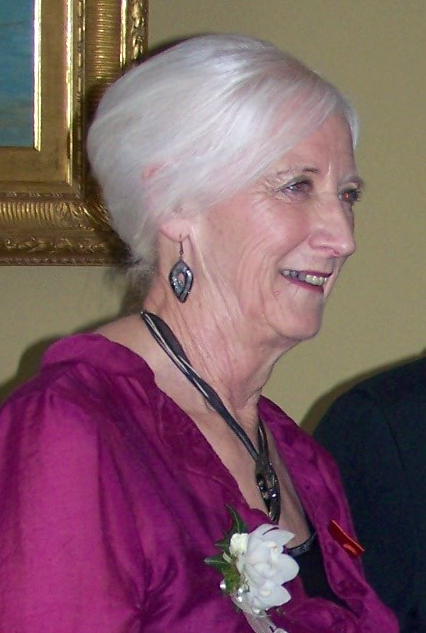
Lois Muir

=== Companion (CNZM) ===
- Dr Russell Ballard – of Wellington. For public services.
- John Maurice Chetwin – of Kakanui; lately of Wellington. For public services.
- Professor Robin Jon Hawes Clark – of Radlett, Hertfordshire, United Kingdom. For services to science and New Zealand interests in the United Kingdom.
- Sharon Margaret Crosbie OBE – of Wellington. For services to broadcasting and the community.
- Professor Graeme Fogelberg – of Dunedin. For services to education.
- Professor (David) Gareth Jones – of Dunedin. For services to science and education.
- Brigadier Clive William Lilley – Brigadiers' List, New Zealand Army.
- Dr William McArthur – of Hamilton. For services to business, education and the community.
- The Right Reverend John Richard Randerson – of Auckland. For services to the community.
- The Honourable Peter Maxwell Salmon QC – of Auckland. For services to the judiciary.
- Michael Duncan Smither – of Whitianga. For services to the arts.
- Sheryl Wells – of Auckland. For services to netball.
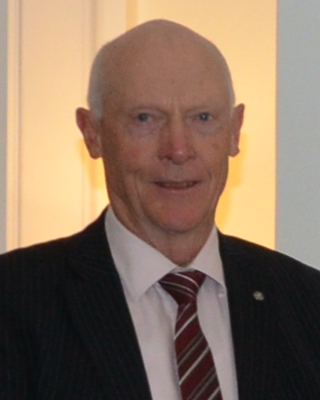
Russ Ballard

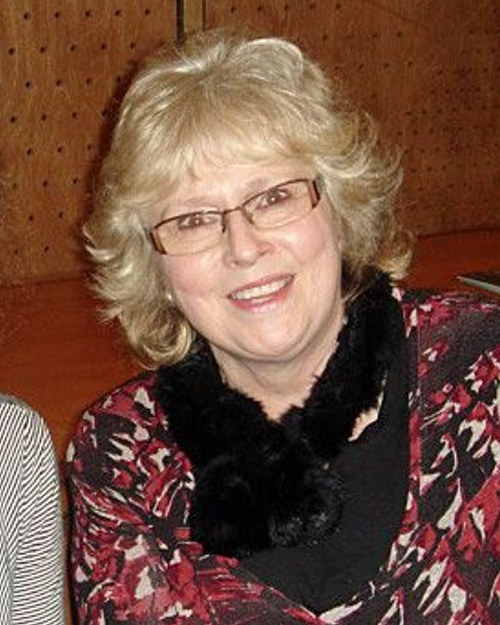
Sharon Crosbie

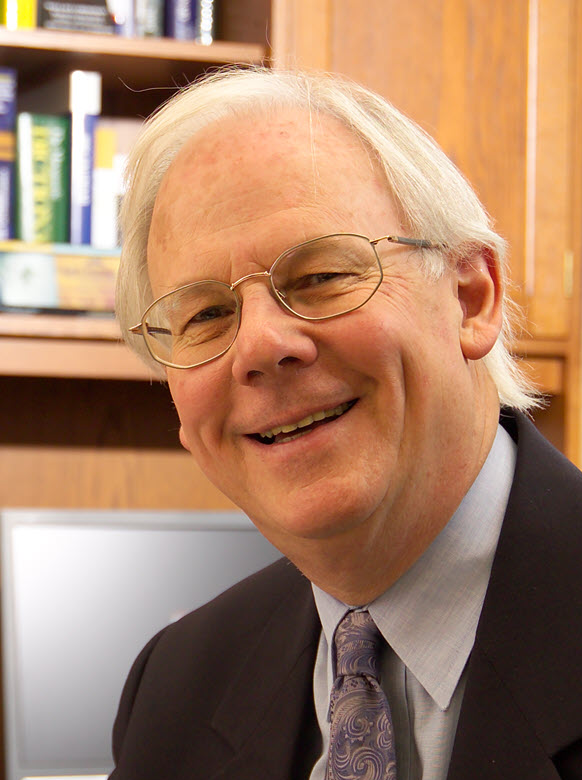
Gareth Jones

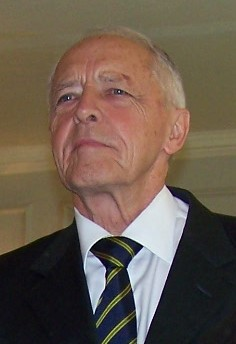
Peter Salmon

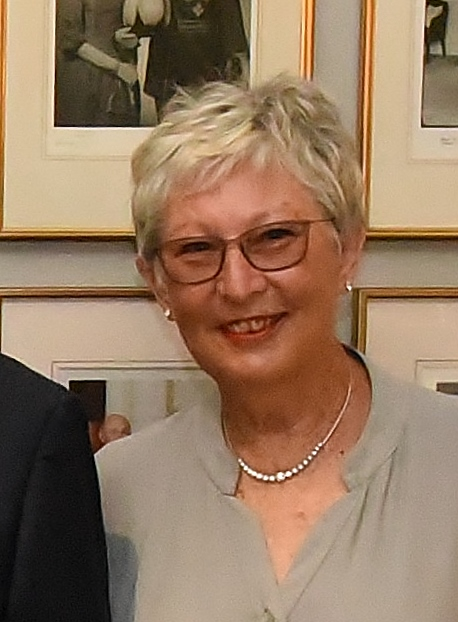
Sheryl Wells

=== Officer (ONZM) ===
- Christine Lynn Boswijk – of Richmond. For services to ceramic art.
- Richard Meckiff Campion – of Wellington. For services to the theatre.
- Professor Raewyn Mary Dalziel – of Auckland. For services to education.
- Professor Brett Delahunt – of Wellington. For services to pathology.
- Ngila Beryl Dickson – of Auckland. For services to design and the film industry.
- William Graham Garland – of Cambridge. For services to farming and conservation.
- Professor Keith Grimwood – of Wellington. For services to cystic fibrosis research.
- Professor Barry Selwyn Gustafson – of Auckland. For services to political science and historical research.
- Arnold John Heine QSM – of Lower Hutt. For services to outdoor recreation.
- Robert Edward Jeffrey – of Tauranga. For services to agriculture and export.
- Brian John Lynch – of Wellington. For public services and services to the meat industry.
- Dr Maurice Jack Orpin – of Whangārei. For services to medicine and the community.
- Norman Jack Rumsey – of Lower Hutt. For services to optics and astronomy.
- Emeritus Professor David Norman Sharpe – of Auckland. For services to medicine.
- Susan Mary Simcock – of Auckland. For services to sports administration and squash.
- Walter Leonard Stone – of Kaikōura. For services to tourism.
- William Robin Taylor – of Raurimu. For services to children's literature and the community.
- Donald Francis Tricker – of Porirua. For services to softball.
- Morris William Walker – of Queenstown. For services to aviation and industry.
- Professor Ian Douglas Watson JP – of North Shore City. For services to education.

Additional

- Group Captain Robert Shaun Clarke – Royal New Zealand Air Force.
- Major Gregory Phillip Wilson – Corps of Royal New Zealand Engineers.

Honorary

- Maurice Fareed Khalaf QSM – of Amman, Jordan. For services as honorary consul in Jordan.
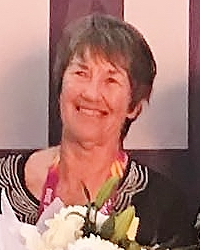
Susie Simcock

=== Member (MNZM) ===
- William Robert Allen – of Auckland. For services to education and the arts.
- Lieutenant Colonel Kevin Charles Baff – Royal New Zealand Infantry Regiment (Territorial Force).
- Major Warren John Banks ED – Royal New Zealand Infantry Regiment (Territorial Force).
- Major Ian Douglas Bateman – Royal New Zealand Corps of Signals.
- John Humphry Bayly – of Wairoa. For services to commerce and the community.
- Daphne Lois Bell JP – of Hamilton. For services to the community.
- Philippa Jane Boyens – of Wellington. For services to film.
- Barry James Cotton – of Christchurch. For services to harness racing and industry.
- Deirdre Hope Dale JP – of Porirua. For services to education and the community.
- Alan Stanley de Malmanche – of Auckland. For services to the theatre.
- Associate Professor John Terence Dennis – of Dunedin. For services to music.
- Squadron Leader Frank Verran Dyer – Royal New Zealand Air Force.
- Richard John Frizzell – of Havelock North. For services to the arts.
- Margaret Doris Leslie Fyfe – of Porirua. For services to mountaineering and outdoor recreation.
- Anne Elizabeth Geddes – of Auckland. For services to photography and the community.
- Dr Anwar-Ul Ghani JP – of Hamilton. For services to the Muslim community.
- Ian Mackenzie Gibson – of Waitakere (West Auckland). For services to the New Zealand Returned Services Association.
- Gregory James Gilpin – of Levin; inspector, New Zealand Police. For services to the New Zealand Police.
- Dr John Murray Hedley – of Blenheim. For services to public health.
- Khalid (Billy) Ibadulla – of Dunedin. For services to cricket.
- Lucy Lawless – of Auckland. For services to entertainment and the community.
- Colleen (Kate) Margaret Leslie JP – of Warkworth. For services to the community.
- Grant McMillan Major – of Auckland. For services to film.
- Moana Maree Maniapoto – of Auckland. For services to Māori and music.
- Jarrad Rangi Martin – of Waitara. For services to softball.
- Acting Leading Marine Technician (Electrical) Bjorn Grant MacRae – Royal New Zealand Navy.
- Pieri Rota Munro – of Wellington; superintendent, New Zealand Police. For services to the New Zealand Police.
- John Lawrance Nicholls – of Rotorua. For services to ecology and forest research.
- Warwick Burns Nicoll – of North Shore City. For services to education and the community.
- Joseph Tuahine Northover – of Napier. For services to Māori and the community.
- Harold Vincent O'Rourke JP – of Auckland. For services to judo.
- Dr Barry William Oliver Partridge – of Tauranga. For services to medicine.
- Annette Eleanor Pearson de Gonzalez – of Bogotá, Colombia. For services as New Zealand honorary consul in Colombia.
- Beverley Joan Randell Price – of Wellington. For services to children's literature and education.
- Warrant Officer Marine Technician (Electrical) Howard Neil Carter Rait – Royal New Zealand Navy.
- Cecil Renwick – of Waitakere City. For services to cricket.
- Mervyn Bruce Restall – of Christchurch. For services to surf life saving and the community.
- Dr Leslie Thomas Robertson JP – of Mangonui. For services to education, youth and the community.
- Graeme Arthur Rogerson – of Hamilton. For services to the Thoroughbred industry.
- Beverly Janice Savage – of Hamilton. For services to athletes with disabilities.
- James William Arthur Selkirk – of Wellington. For services to film.
- Harvey Newson Edward Sheppard – of Auckland. For services to marine safety and shooting.
- Neil Willas Shroff – of Auckland. For services to the community.
- Geoffrey Neville Sinclair – of Waitakere City. For services to journalism.
- Dr Russell Peter Smith – of Christchurch. For services to the visually impaired.
- Eldred Claude Stebbing – of North Shore City. For services to the recording and entertainment industries.
- Robert Nopera (Chubb) Tangaroa – of Havelock North. For services to softball.
- Te Warena Warren Jack Taua – of Manukau City. For services to Māori and conservation.
- Aubrey Tokawhakaea Temara – of Rotorua. For services to conservation.
- Jocelyn Margaret Thornton – of Wellington. For services to the earth sciences.
- Walter Mervyn Wallace – of Auckland. For services to cricket.
- Gillian Shirley Wratt – of Wellington; lately of Lyttelton. For services to the New Zealand Antarctic programme.

Additional

- Lindsay John Duncan – inspector, New Zealand Police, Upper Hutt. For services in the Solomon Islands.
- Lance Corporal Shaun William Forsyth – Corps of Royal New Zealand Engineers.
- Major Benjamin Robert John Green – Royal Regiment of New Zealand Artillery.
- Squadron Leader Shaun Allen Johnson – Royal New Zealand Air Force.
- Warrant Officer Class One Michael David Ross – Corps of Royal New Zealand Engineers.
- Wing Commander Ronald James Thacker – Royal New Zealand Air Force.
- Sergeant Paewai Tume – Royal New Zealand Infantry Regiment.

Honorary

- Tomonobu Nakamura – of Shizuoka, Japan. For services to Japanese–New Zealand relations.
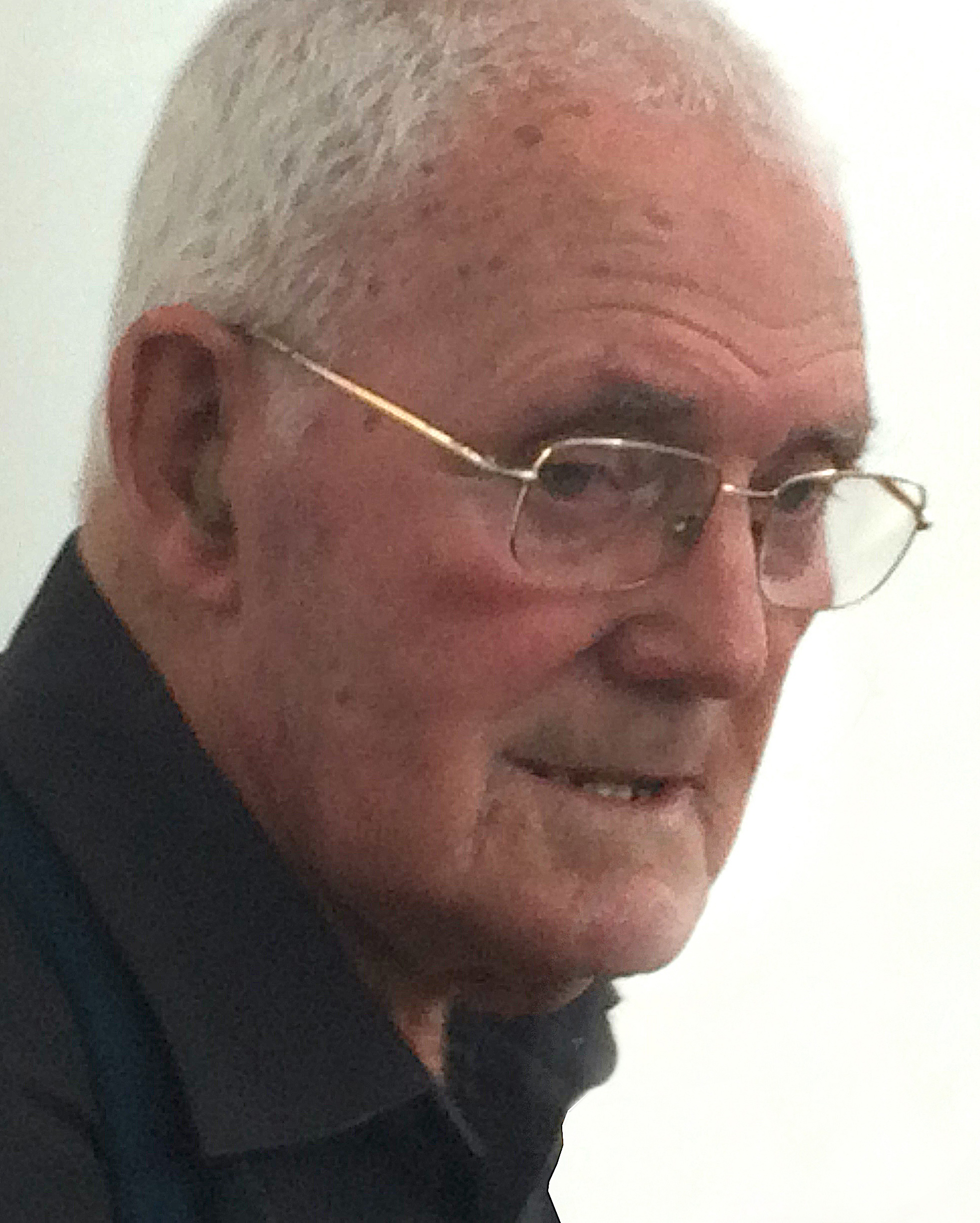
Jim Allen

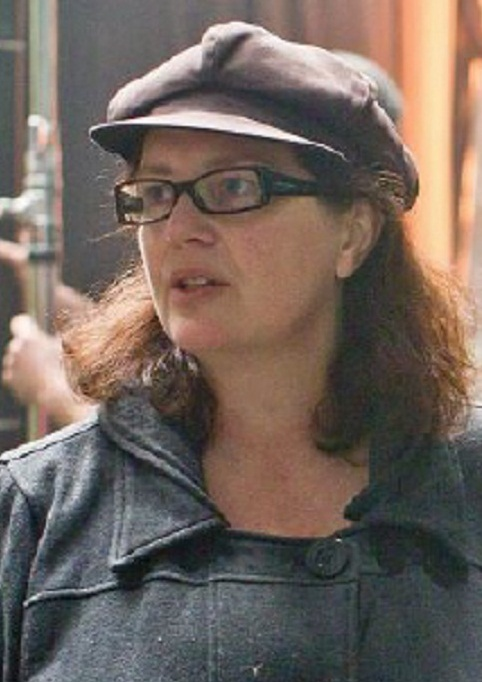
Philippa Boyens

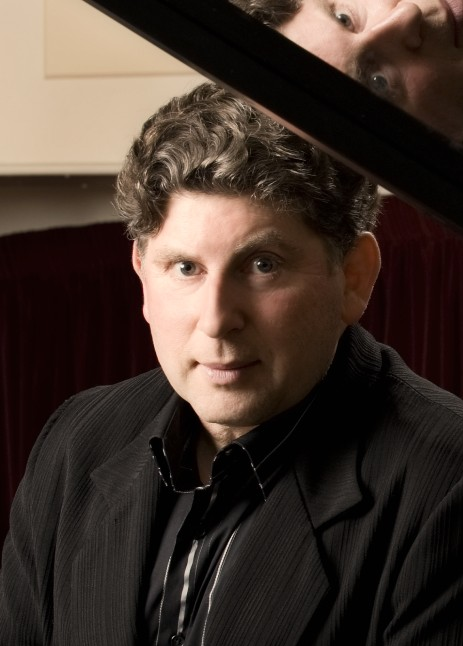
Terence Dennis

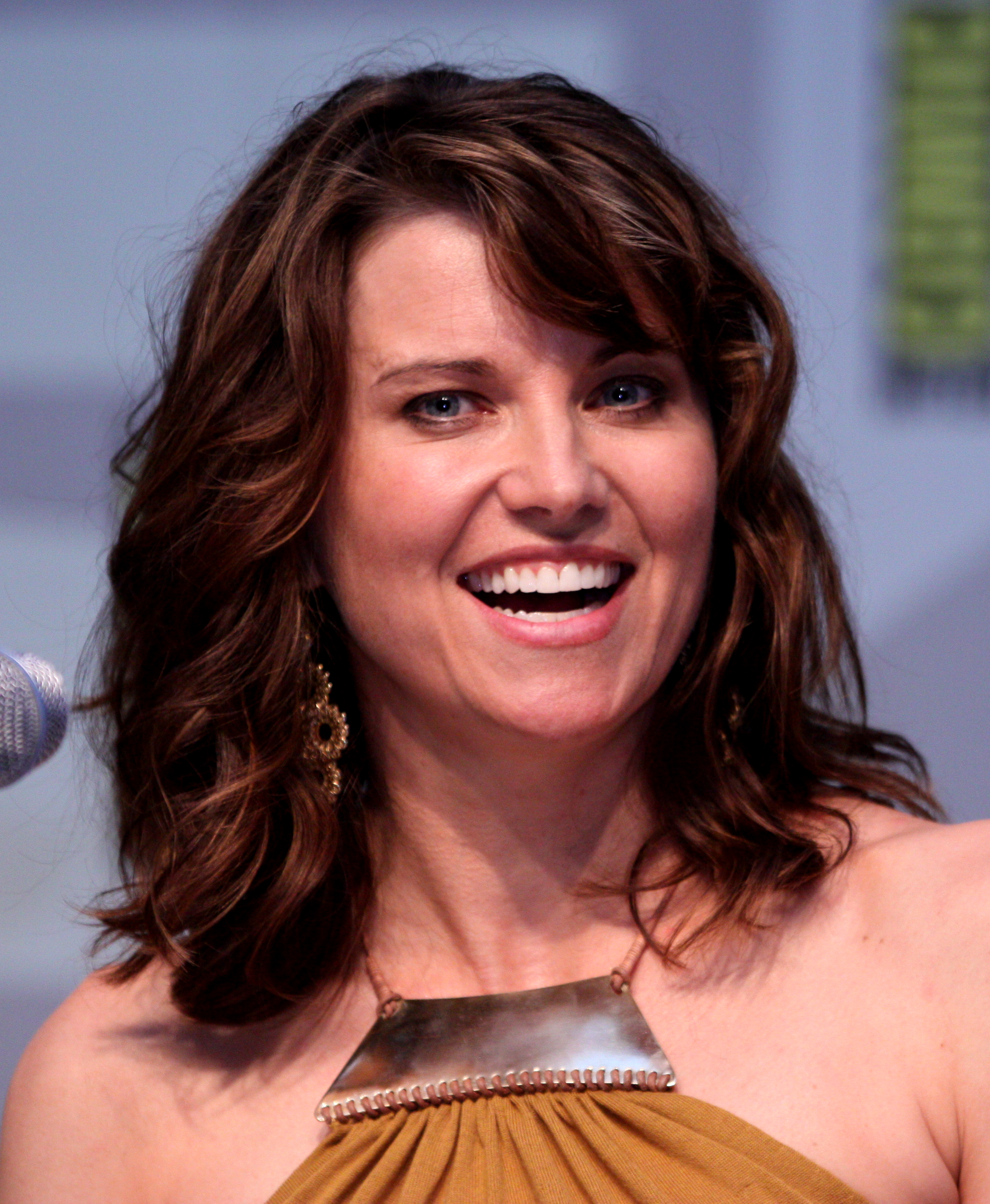
Lucy Lawless

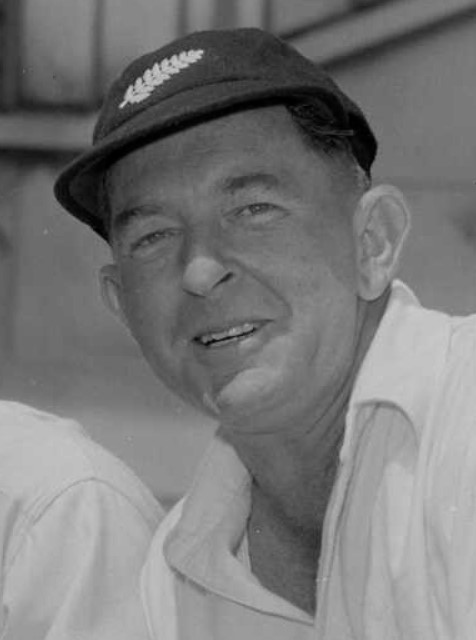
Merv Wallace

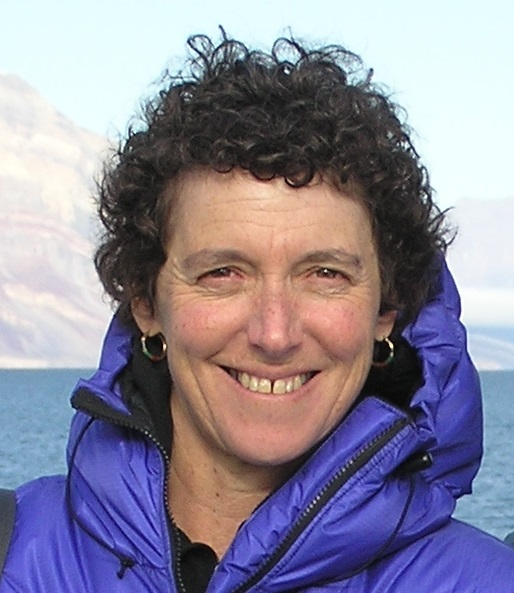
Gillian Wratt

== Companion of the Queen's Service Order (QSO) ==
=== For community service ===
- Raymond Aubrey Ian Harper QSM – of Invercargill.
- Rosemary Anne Horton QSM – of Auckland.
- Alister George James – of Christchurch.
- Marie-Louise Rosson JP – of Cromwell.
- Hone Meihana Taumaunu – of Gisborne.
- The Very Reverend James Thomas – of Wellington.
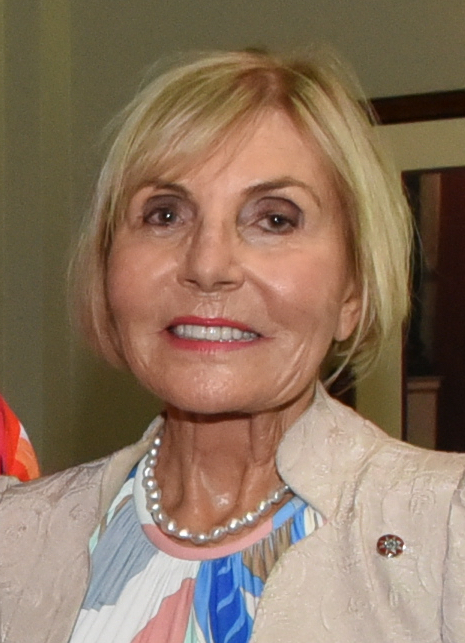
Rosie Horton

=== For public services ===
- Peter Spencer Bygate – of Wellington.
- Thomas Glendwr Gardner (Glen) Evans – of Lower Hutt.
- Barbara Winifred Glenie – of Auckland.
- Alexander (Lex) Grey – of Orewa.
- Winifred Norien Hoadley – of North Shore City.
- Graham Desmond Kelly – of Porirua; currently in Ottawa, Canada.
- Dr Alistair Peter McGeorge – of Auckland.
- The Honourable Roger Francis Hamilton Maxwell – of Urenui.
- Margaret May Stanners – of Orewa.
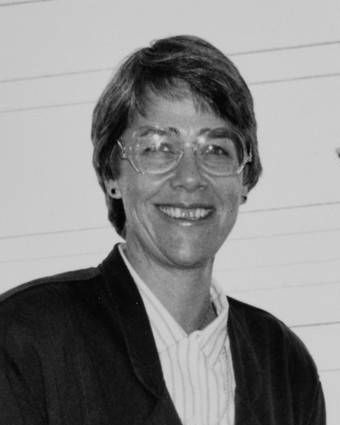
Wyn Hoadley

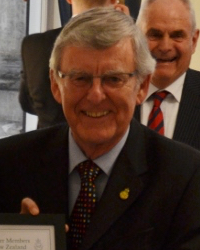
Graham Kelly

== Queen's Service Medal (QSM) ==
=== For community service ===
- Ellen Aldcroft – of Balclutha.
- Heather Mary Alford – of Auckland.
- Hester Ada Bauckham – of Napier.
- Zisis (Bruce) Avangelos Blades – of Wellington.
- Naomi Te Aorere Carleen Brell – of Rotorua.
- Nanette Helen Cameron – of Auckland.
- Roger Oscar Clausen – of Palmerston North.
- Christopher John Cowan – of Greymouth.
- Esther Margaret Croft – of Kurow.
- Lorraine Mary Diamond – of Kaikohe.
- Sandra (Ann) Dick – of Dunedin.
- James Milne Dick – of Dunedin.
- Ronald Albert Fensom – of Christchurch.
- Adele Lona Gibb – of Feilding.
- Catherine Frances Goodyear – of Dunedin.
- Gordon Gregory – of Gisborne.
- Daniel Edwin Harris – of Hamilton.
- Clifford Brian Heraud – of Whitianga.
- Joan Ramsay Hookway – of North Shore City.
- Gladys Vere Hope – of Dunedin.
- Robert Kennett – of Paihia.
- Dr Geoffrey William Lindsay Knight – of Te Kauwhata.
- Stella Sin Kam Yin Li – of Auckland.
- Frances Catherine McKenzie – of Tākaka.
- Josephine Helen Marfell – of Blenheim.
- Leo James Mountford – of Rangiora.
- Alison Christina Neill – of Fairlie.
- Makere Nikora – of Rotorua.
- Iris Olwyn Orchard – of Christchurch.
- Eleanor Mary Peneha – of Nightcaps.
- Louise Pivac – of Dargaville.
- Angeline Pourau – of Masterton.
- Mervyn John Falconer Reay – of Hamilton.
- Dorothy Peggy Simmons – of Whakatāne.
- Joan Catherine Stanley – of Matamata.

=== For public services ===
- Ruth Christine Allan – of Lower Hutt.
- Kaye Jo-Ann Calder – of Porirua.
- Raymond Noel Coleman JP – of Waitakere City; fire safety officer, New Zealand Fire Service.
- Ernest Arthur Cook JP – of Hokitika.
- James George – of Dunedin.
- Warren William Flaunty JP – of Waitakere City.
- Helen Mary Glasgow – of Wellington.
- Malcolm John Frederick Guy JP – of Koputaroa.
- Russell Lindsay Hallam – of Rotorua.
- Taane Wharemokai Heke-Kaiawha – of Tauranga.
- Alan Douglas Horner – of Hāwera.
- Mana Elizabeth Hunkin – of Nūhaka.
- William Edgar (Garry) Jeffery – of Christchurch.
- Clifford Dean Jones – of Tūrangi; senior constable, New Zealand Police.
- Brian Thomas Joyce – of Christchurch; fire region commander, New Zealand Fire Service.
- Bruce William Leadley – of Timaru.
- Colin McSporran MacGougan JP – of Timaru.
- Henry John McCleary – of Waipawa; lately Firefighter, Waipawa Volunteer Fire Brigade, New Zealand Fire Service.
- Whetu Marama McGregor JP – of Waitakere City.
- Trevor Stuart Malloch – of Palmerston North.
- Raewyn Osborne Merrick – of Tauranga.
- Francis Raymond O'Connell – of Westport.
- Helen Josephine (Sister Mary Leonie) O'Neill – of Christchurch.
- Lorraine Lilian Peacock – of Dunedin.
- Graeme Leslie Pennell – of Tokoroa; lately chief fire officer, Tokoroa Volunteer Fire Brigade, New Zealand Fire Service.
- Warwick Andre Pudney – of Auckland.
- Jan Marie Riddell – of Winton.
- Gerald Edward Rowan – of Waitakere City.
- Rangi Te Puru Sydney Sewell – of Rotorua.
- Lawrence Leo Stack – of Christchurch.
- Garry Raymond Thin – of Christchurch.
- Melda Frances Townsley JP – of Wellington.
- Rosemary Tully – of Whakatāne.
- Mere Sholto Tunks – of Waitakere City.
- Douglas Allan Turner – of Kerikeri.
- Murray Herbert Wells – of Urenui.
- Dagmar Wilhelm – of Berlin, Germany.

Honorary

- Masako Yoshikawa – of Tokyo, Japan.
