= Motueka High School =

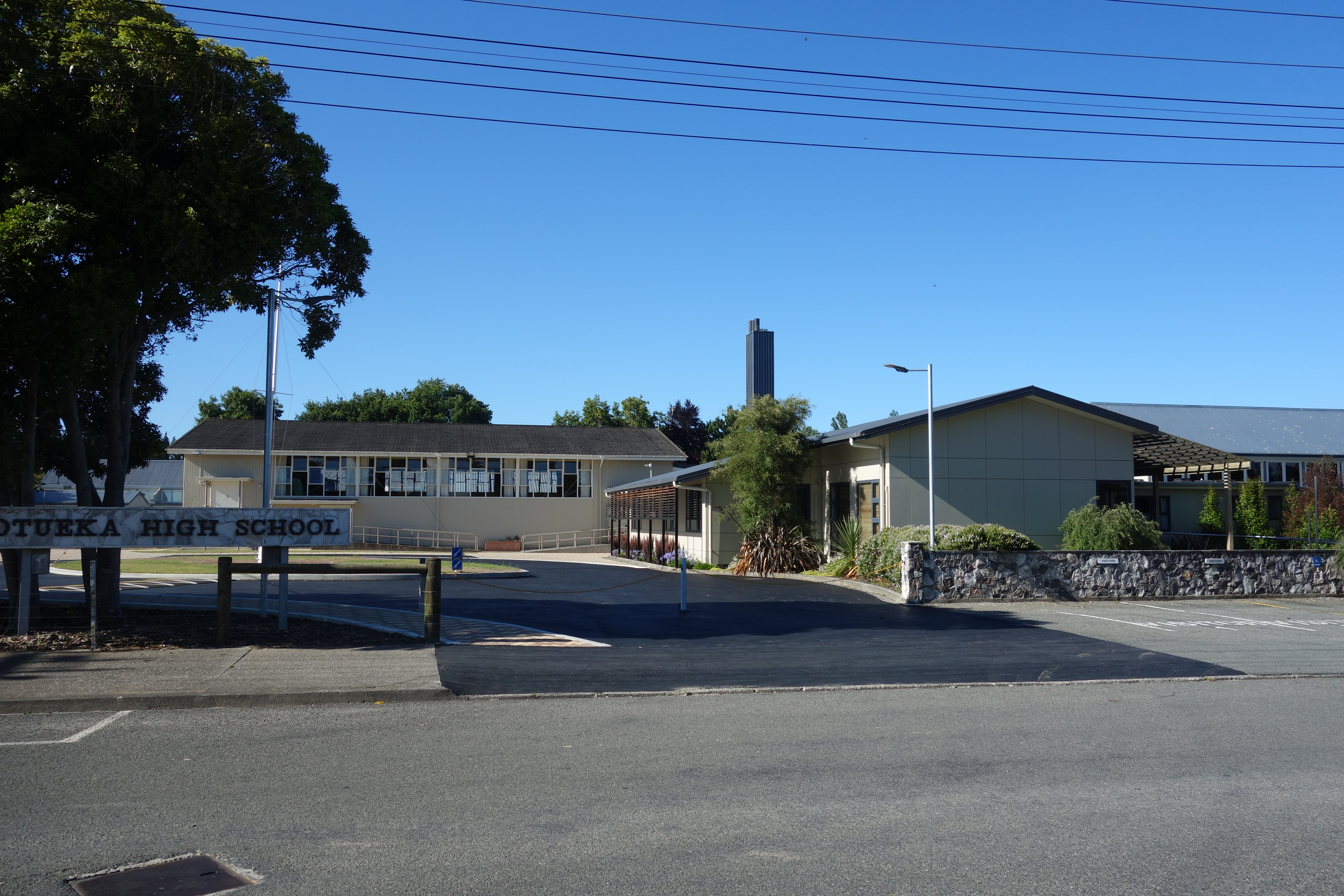

Location
- Whakarewa Street, Motueka, New Zealand; 41.1148°S 173.0047°E

Information
- Type: Coeducational Secondary School (Year 9–13)
- Motto: Today's Learners, Tomorrow's Leaders
- Established: 1955
- Ministry of Education Institution no.: 298
- Principal: John Prestidge
- Enrolment: 718 (July 2026)
- Socio-economic decile: 5
- Website: motuekahigh.school.nz

Motueka High School is a coeducational secondary school in Motueka, New Zealand, established in 1955.

== Notable alumni ==
- Shannon Francois – netball player
- David Havili – rugby union player
- Risi Pouri-Lane – rugby sevens player
- Gillian Wratt – director of the New Zealand Antarctic Programme
