= Sustainable Water Programme of Action =

The Sustainable Water Programme of Action was established in 2003 to address concerns about fresh water in New Zealand.

== See also ==
- Water in New Zealand
- Agriculture in New Zealand
