= Peter Skelton (judge) =

New Zealand judge and commissioner (born 1939)

Sir Peter Skelton KNZM
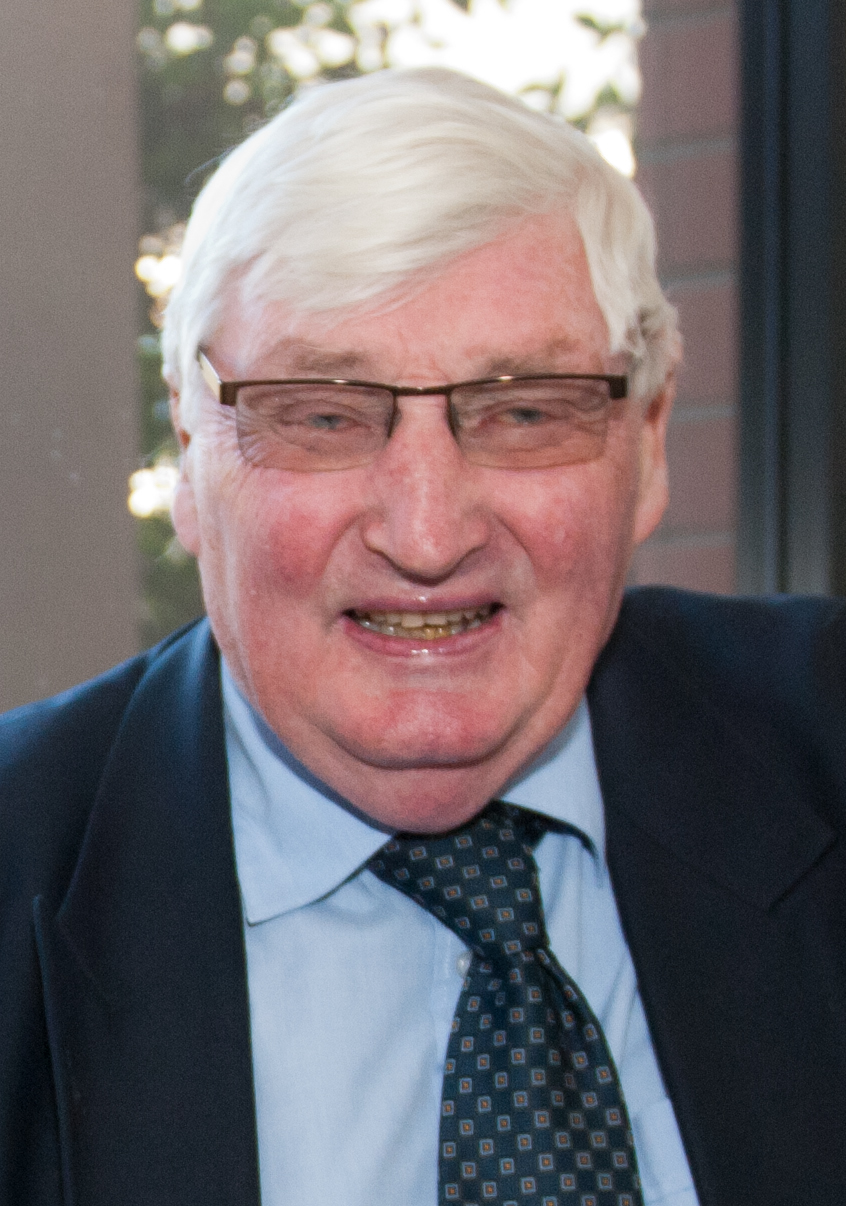
- Skelton in 2011

Personal details
- Born: Peter Robert Skelton; 13 October 1939 (age 85); Christchurch, New Zealand
- Spouse: Elizabeth Kathleen Carter (m. 1962; died 2025)
- Children: 3
- Education: LLB (1965)
- Alma mater: University of Auckland
- Occupation: Lawyer; judge; academic

Sir Peter Robert Skelton KNZM (born 13 October 1939) is a retired judge of the Environment Court in New Zealand. After retiring from the bench, he taught environmental law at Lincoln University for some years in the early 2000s. From 2010 to 2019, he was a government-appointed commissioner at Environment Canterbury. He was knighted in the 2025 New Year Honours, for services to environmental law.

== Early life ==
Skelton was born on 13 October 1939 in Christchurch, New Zealand. His parents were George Arthur Skelton and Helen Ainslie Dundas (née Paterson). He was educated at Cashmere Primary School and then Christ's College, where he was student number 6219. At Christ's, he was awarded colours for tennis and athletics, focussing on middle-distance running. He also played basketball. He studied at the University of Auckland and graduated with a Bachelor of Laws (LLB) degree in 1965. While at Auckland, he was a member of the university basketball team from 1959 to 1962.

== Professional career ==
Skelton started his legal career in 1959 when he joined the Auckland law firm Rennie Cox and Garlick as a law clerk while attending university. From 1965 to 1975, Skelton was a with the Hamilton legal firm Harkness Henry and Co as a barrister. From 1975 to 1978, he was a barrister sole. (Note: A barrister sole is a law professional who practices on their own, not attached to a law firm.) His work involved town planning, country planning, and environmental issues. As a barrister sole, he had intended to specialise in personal injury law, but this was stymied by the introduction of the introduction of New Zealand's no-fault accidental injury compensation scheme administered by the Accident Compensation Corporation. He consequently focused on environmental law. During his time in Hamilton, he was a member of the Hamilton District Law Society Council. In 1969, he helped organise the Law Society Centennial Conference.

In 1978, Skelton was appointed as judge for what was to become the District Court and the Planning Tribunal. He was based in Christchurch and was the first judge of the Planning Tribunal in the South Island; up until then, the Planning Tribunal had been based in Auckland and Wellington only. Through the introduction of the Resource Management Act 1991, the Planning Tribunal became the Environment Court in 1996. Skelton retired as a judge in 2000. It is estimated that he made over 1000 judgements in his 22 years on the bench.

Upon his retirement from the bench, Skelton was invited by Lincoln University to teach environmental law. He took up the invitation and was made an associate professor, teaching environmental law from February 2000. He retired from teaching in October 2005 after nearly six years in that job. The university later made him an honorary professor.

In March 2010, the John Key National Government sacked the Environment Canterbury councillors and replaced them with seven commissioners, of which Skelton was one. Skelton was appointed for three terms as a commissioner and served until the 2019 local elections, when the regional council reverted to a fully elected body.

The Freshwater Planning Process was established by the Resource Management Amendment Act 2020 and is facilitated by the Office of the Chief Freshwater Commissioner. Skelton was appointed as the inaugural chief commissioner in 2020; he retired in 2022 after 18 months in the role and was replaced by Environment Court judge Laurie Newhook.

== Other activities ==
Skelton has served as an executive member of the National Old People's Welfare Council and a member of the National Marriage Guidance Council. He has also been a member of the Waikato Anglican Synod and the General Synod of the Church of the Province of New Zealand.

== Honours and awards ==
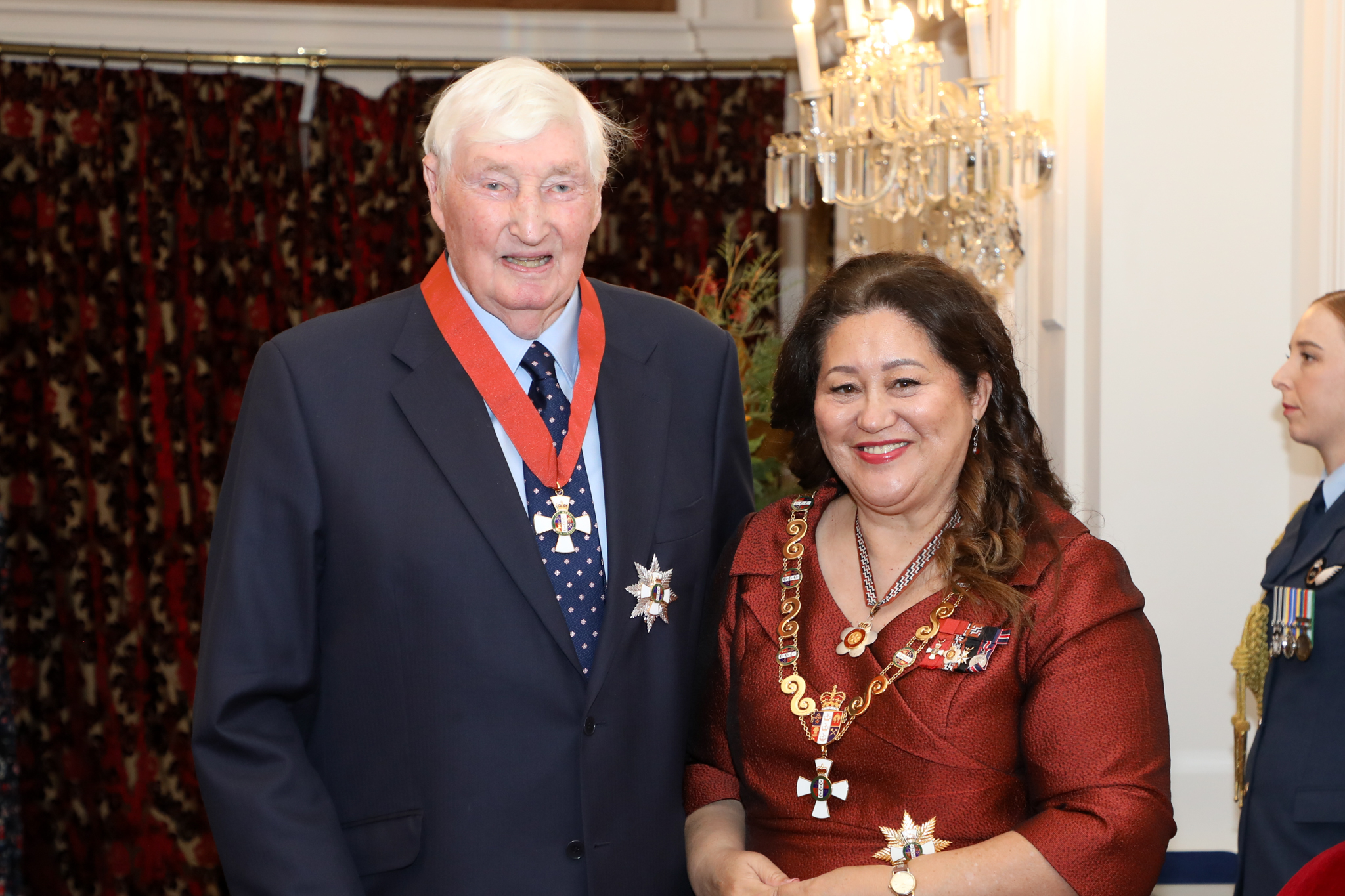
Skelton (left), after his investiture as a Knight Companion of the New Zealand Order of Merit by the governor-general, Dame Cindy Kiro, at Government House, Wellington, on 29 April 2025

In 1990, Skelton received the New Zealand 1990 Commemoration Medal. After Skelton's retirement as a judge, the New Zealand Planning Institute awarded him the Alfred O. Glasse Award "for outstanding services to planning other than in a professional capacity" in mid-2000. Later that year, he was appointed Companion of the New Zealand Order of Merit (CNZM), for services to environmental law, in the 2001 New Year Honours. In 2013, the New Zealand Resource Management Law Association awarded Skelton the Principal Judge John Bollard Lifetime Commemorative Award, an occasionally presented honour for exceptional individuals. On 8 April 2016, Lincoln University conferred an honorary degree of Doctor of Natural Resources on Skelton. In the 2025 New Year Honours, Skelton was promoted to Knight Companion of the New Zealand Order of Merit, for services to environmental law.

== Personal life ==
In 1962, Skelton married Elizabeth Kathleen Carter (known by her middle name). They were to have two sons and one daughter. From 1979, the Skeltons lived in the Christchurch suburb of Fendalton. Kathleen, Lady Skelton, died in 2025.
