= Gillian Wratt =

New Zealand Antarctic executive (born 1954)

Gillian Wratt MNZM
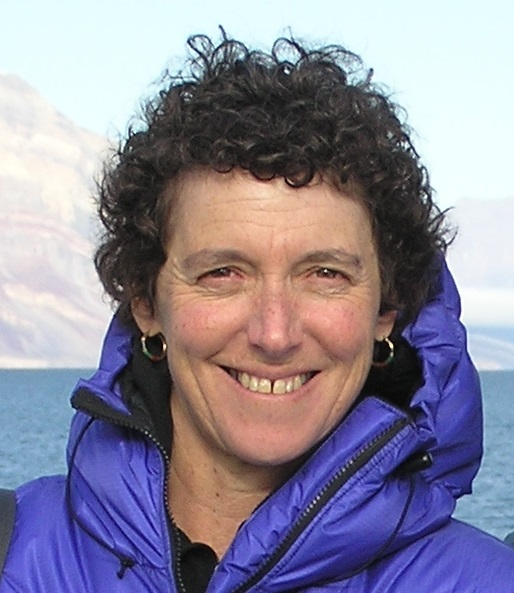
- Wratt in 2016
- Born: 1954 (age 71–72)
- Known for: Science administration
- Scientific career
- Institutions: Antarctica New Zealand

Gillian Shirley Wratt MNZM (born 1954) is a New Zealand botanist and science administrator. She was the first woman director of the New Zealand Antarctic Programme (1992–1996) and made a Member of the New Zealand Order of Merit for services to Antarctica.

== Early life and education ==
Wratt was born in Motueka and attended Motueka High School. She gained a B.Sc. degree with honours in Botany (1972–1975) from the University of Canterbury in Christchurch, New Zealand. She joined the Plant Physiology Division of the Department of Scientific and Industrial Research (DSIR) in Palmerston North in 1977 and in 1979 was transferred to Wellington, where she worked for the Natural Research Advisory Council as the secretary to the Primary Production Committee which was concerned with research programmes and their funding. A DSIR study award enabled her to gain a master's degree in Business Administration from the University of Sydney (1990).

== Career and impact ==
Wratt was Director of the New Zealand Antarctic Programme from 1992 to 1996 (being its first woman director) and then chief executive of the newly formed New Zealand Antarctic Institute (Antarctica New Zealand) from 1996 to 2002. She has also held a number of advisory positions relating to Antarctic science and operations including Chair of the Council of Managers of National Antarctic Programs (COMNAP), 1998–2002, Vice Chair of Antarctic Treaty Committee on Environmental Protection, 1998–2001; Chair of the Cape Roberts Project Operations Management Group, 1993–2001. Wratt authored a history of COMNAP, “A Story of Antarctic Co-operation: 25 Years of the Council of Managers of National Antarctic Programs”, published in 2013.

She has worked in a range of scientific and environmental management roles in addition to her Antarctic roles, including environment negotiator for New Zealand free trade agreements, and establishment unit convenor for the Crop and Food Research Institute. Notably, Wratt was chief executive of the not-for-profit Cawthron Institute during 2006–2012. She is currently a board member of the New Zealand Environmental Protection Authority. In 2018 she became the chair of the New Zealand Antarctic Science Platform Steering Group, a seven-year initiative to boost New Zealand science in and around Antarctica. She is also a Freshwater Commissioner in the Office of the Chief Freshwater Commissioner.

== Awards and honours ==
She was awarded the New Zealand Suffrage Centennial Medal in 1993, and was appointed a Member of the New Zealand Order of Merit, for services to the New Zealand Antarctic programme, in the 2004 Queen's Birthday Honours.
