= Office of the Chief Freshwater Commissioner =

Governmental organisation in New Zealand

The Office of the Chief Freshwater Commissioner is a New Zealand government commission established by the Resource Management Amendment Act 2020, as part of a new Freshwater Planning Process (FPP). The Resource Management Amendment Act 2020 required regional councils and unitary authorities to have freshwater plans in place by 2024. These plans were to give effect to the National Policy Statement for Freshwater Management. The Chief Freshwater Commissioner must be a current or retired Environment Court judge, and is appointed by the Minister for the Environment. The Office operates independently and does not provide policy advice.

== Chief Freshwater Commissioner ==
Professor Peter Skelton CNZM was appointed as the first Chief Commissioner. Skelton retired in 2022 and was replaced by environment court judge Laurie Newhook.

The role of the Chief Freshwater Commissioner includes:

- determining the appropriate size and composition of freshwater hearings panels
- considering regional council and tangata whenua nominations to a freshwater hearings panel
- convening a freshwater hearings panel and appointing its members, including the chair
- considering any requests to extend freshwater planning timeframes from a regional council or chair of the freshwater hearings panel
- considering any variations to freshwater plans proposed by a regional council (after documentation provided to the Chief).

== Freshwater Commissioners ==
The Minister for the Environment also appoints Freshwater Commissioners, to participate in panels. Such commissioners must be accredited under section 39A of the Resource Management Act 1991 and collectively they must have knowledge of and expertise in:

- judicial processes and cross-examination
- freshwater quality, quantity and ecology
- the Resource Management Act 1991
- tikanga Māori and mātauranga Māori.

As of September 2023, the commissioners are:

- Judge Craig Thompson, previously Deputy Solicitor-General for New Zealand
- Andrew Fenemor, integrated catchment management expert and former president of the NZ Hydrological Society
- Antoine Coffin, Māori resource management specialist
- Alec Neill, Environment Canterbury councillor and previous chair of the Environment Select Committee
- Basil Morrison, director and Waitangi Tribunal member
- Gina Sweetman, Resource Management Act hearings commissioner
- Greg Ryder, ecological consultant
- Ian Boothroyd, freshwater biologist
- Kate McArthur, freshwater scientist and consultant, president of the New Zealand Freshwater Sciences Society
- Ron Crosby, Waitangi Tribunal member
- Mark St.Clair, environmental planning and policy consultant
- Ngaire Phillips, aquatic ecologist and toxicologist
- Rob van Voorthysen, hearings commissioner
- Liz Burge, Resource Management commissioner
- Sarah Ongley, barrister working in environmental and local government law
- Sheena Tepania, barrister and consultant on environmental planning and kaupapa Māori
- David Hill, independent hearings commissioner
- Gillian Wratt, scientist, previous chief executive of Cawthron Institute and Antarctica New Zealand
- Matt Heale, planner and resource management hearings commissioner
- Gillian Crowcroft, environmental scientist and hearings commissioner
- Nigel Mark-Brown, chartered professional civil and environmental engineer
- Peter Weir, geoscientist and engineer
