= Journal of Medical Ethics =

- Discipline: Medical ethics
- Language: English
- Edited by: Brian D. Earp, Lucy Frith, Arianne Shahvisi

Publication details
- History: 1975–present
- Publisher: BMJ Group for the Institute of Medical Ethics and BMJ
- Frequency: Monthly
- Impact factor: 4.4 (2025)

Standard abbreviations
- ISO 4: J. Med. Ethics

Indexing
- ISSN: 0306-6800 (print); 1473-4257 (web)
- OCLC no.: 1838186

Links
- Journal homepage; Online access; Online archive

The Journal of Medical Ethics (JME) is a monthly peer-reviewed academic journal covering the field of bioethics that was established in 1975. It is owned by the Institute of Medical Ethics and BMJ and published by BMJ. According to the Journal Citation Reports, the journal has a 2024 impact factor of 3.4.

== Editors-in-chief ==
The editors-in-chief are Brian D. Earp (National University of Singapore), Lucy Frith (University of Manchester) and Arianne Shahvisi (Brighton and Sussex Medical School). Previous editors have been: John McMillan (University of Otago) (2018-2025), Julian Savulescu (University of Oxford and National University of Singapore) (2011–2018 and 2001–2004), Søren Holm (Cardiff University) and John Harris (University of Manchester, (jointly, 2004–2011), Raanan Gillon (Imperial College London, 1980–2001), and Alastair Campbell (University of Edinburgh, 1975–1980, founding editor).

== See also ==
- List of ethics journals
