= Trophic level index =

Measure of nutrient status of lakes

The trophic level index (TLI) is used in New Zealand as a measure of nutrient status of lakes. It is similar to the trophic state index but was proposed as alternative that suited New Zealand.

The system uses four criteria, phosphorus and nitrogen concentrations, as well as visual clarity and algal biomass weighted equally.

Lake type	Trophic level	Chla (mg m^{−3})	Secchi depth (m)	TP (mg P m^{−3})	TN (mg N m^{−3})
Ultra-microtrophic	0-1	0.13-0.33	31-24	0.84-1.8	16–34
Microtrophic	1-2	0.33-0.82	24-15	1.8-4.1	34–73
Oligotrophic	2-3	0.82-2.0	15–7.8	4.1-9.0	73–157
Mesotrophic	3-4	2.0-5.0	7.8-3.6	9.0-20	157–337
Eutrophic	4-5	5.0-12	3.6-1.6	20-43	337–725
Supertrophic	5-6	12-31	1.6-0.7	43-96	725–1558
Hypertrophic	6-7	>31	<0.7	>96	>1558

== See also ==
- Water pollution in New Zealand
- Lakes of New Zealand
- Environment of New Zealand
