= Beverley Randell =

New Zealand children's writer

Beverley Joan Randell Price MNZM (born 1931), known by the pen name Beverley Randell, is a New Zealand children's author, whose work has been published by 16 publishers in several languages. Her first story, John the Mouse who Learned to Read, was published in 1955 and sold around 267,000 copies. Randell has written hundreds of books, for both children and adults, but focusing mainly on stories for early readers. Over two million copies of her books have been sold. In the 2004 Queen's Birthday Honours, Randell was appointed a Member of the New Zealand Order of Merit, for services to children's literature and education.

== Work ==
Born in Wellington, Randell studied English and History at Victoria University College before becoming a teacher. In 1955 her first story, John the Mouse who Learned to Read, was published, and has sold around 267,000 copies. She known by the pen name Beverley Randell. Her work has been published by 16 publishers in several languages.

Over the years Randell has written hundreds of books, many aimed at children with limited reading skills, but also books aimed at adults. The Oxford History of New Zealand Literature describes her as having a 'genius for devising…infant readers which used minimal vocabularies to tell actual stories’. Randell married Hugh Price, a publisher, in 1955. To date, over two million copies of her books have been sold.

In the 2004 Queen's Birthday Honours, Randell was appointed a Member of the New Zealand Order of Merit, for services to children's literature and education.

== Honours ==
- Member of the New Zealand Order of Merit (New Zealand) 2004
- Chevalier de la Ordre national du Mérite (France) 2005

== Works ==
Some of Randell's books include:

- Wellington At Work In The 1890s, (Hugh Price joint author) 2009, New Zealand, Steele Roberts ISBN 9781877448607
- Baby Bear Goes Fishing, (Isabel Lowe ill.) 1994, New Zealand, Nelson Price Milburn ISBN 9781869555412
- Baby Hippo, (Elizabeth Russell-Arnot ill.) 1994, New Zealand, Nelson Price Milburn ISBN 9781869558154
- Sally's Beans, (Meredith Thomas ill.) 1994, New Zealand, Nelson Price Milburn ISBN 9781869555641
- Tabby In The Tree, (Julian Bruere ill.) 1994, New Zealand, Nelson Price Milburn ISBN 9781869555412
- Father Bear Goes Fishing, (Isabel Lowe ill.) 1993, New Zealand, Price Milburn ISBN 9781869555535
- The Lion and the Mouse (adapted by Randell), (Clare Bowes ill.) 1976, England, Methuen Educational ISBN 9780423484601
- The Hungry Kitten, (Judith Trevelyan ill.) 1974, England, Methuen Educational ISBN 9780423482607
- Baby Lamb's First Drink, (Ernest Papps ill.) 1973, New Zealand, Price Milburn OCLC 813331653
- Lizard Loses His Tail, (Judith Trevelyan ill.) 1973, New Zealand, Price Milburn OCLC 166307650
- John, The Mouse Who Learned to Read, (Noela Young, ill.) 1969, England, Collins ISBN 9780001953673
