= Alastair Campbell (bioethicist) =

British theologian and bioethicist

Professor Alastair Vincent Campbell
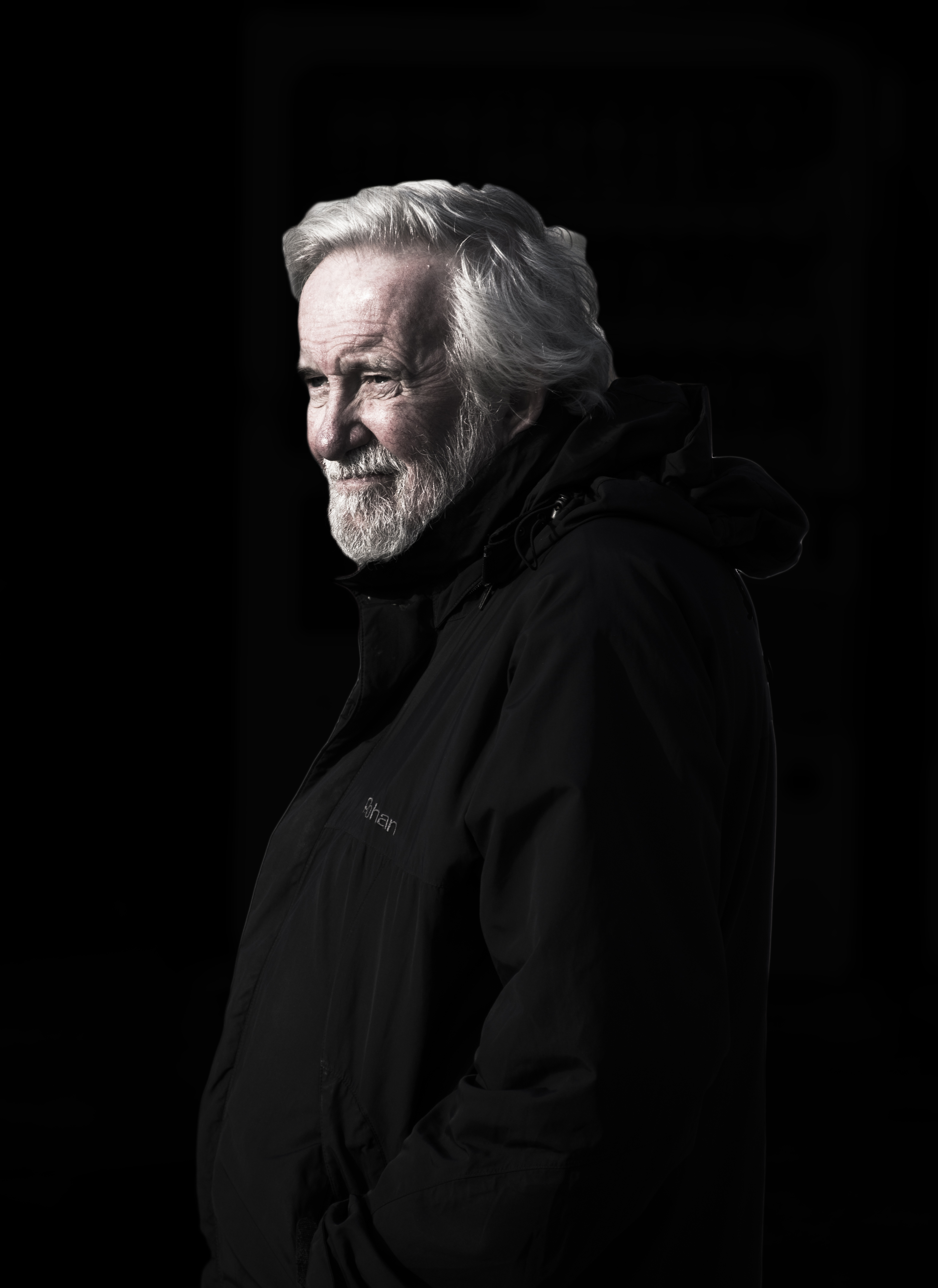
- Born: 16 April 1938 (age 88); Motherwell, Scotland
- Education: University of Edinburgh; Graduate Theological Union
- Website: www.bris.ac.uk/social-community-medicine/people/alastair-v-campbell/

Professor Alastair Vincent Campbell MA, BD, Th.D., FRSE (born 16 April 1938) is a British theologian and bioethicist. He was the founding editor of the Journal of Medical Ethics and received the Henry K. Beecher award from the Hastings Centre in 1999.

== Early life ==
Campbell was born in Motherwell, Scotland. He obtained an MA, philosophy (1st class hons), bachelor of divinity BD from the University of Edinburgh. He was awarded Harkness Fellowship of the Commonwealth Fund of New York and completed a doctorate in theology jointly awarded by the San Francisco Theological Seminary and the Graduate Theological Union, San Francisco.

== Academic career ==
Alastair V. Campbell worked as an Associate Chaplain to the University of Edinburgh from 1964 to 1969 and was a part-time lecturer in ethics at the Royal College of Nursing, Scotland from 1966 to 1972. With Kenneth Boyd, Campbell was joint secretary of the Edinburgh Medical Group, which is one of the medical groups that were forerunners of the Society for the Study of Medical Ethics, founded in 1975. This society later became the Institute of Medical Ethics, of which he is Honorary Vice-president since 2006. From 1975 until 1980, Campbell was the founding editor of the Journal of Medical Ethics.

From 1987 to 1990, he was Associate Dean at the University of Edinburgh School of Divinity. He was a visiting professor at Dartmouth College, New Hampshire (1986) and Otago Medical School (1986/87), where he was later appointed Professor of Biomedical Ethics and Director of the Bioethics Research Centre (1990-1996). From 1996 until 2006, Campbell was Professor of Ethics in Medicine at the University of Bristol, becoming emeritus on retirement.

In August 2006, he became Chen Su Lan Centennial Professor of Medical Ethics and Founding Director of the Centre for Biomedical Ethics (CBmE) at the Yong Loo Lin School of Medicine, National University of Singapore, where the Asian Bioethics Review was established under his purview. After retiring, he remained Emeritus Director and visiting professor.

He has served as the president of the International Association of Bioethics; as a member of the Medical Ethics Committee of the British Medical Association; as vice-chairman of the UK Retained Organs Commission from 2001 to 2004; as chair of the Ethics and Governance Council of UK Biobank from 2005 to 2006; and as president of the Bristol Medico-Chirurgical Society (2003).

== Awards and honours ==
In 1999 Campbell was awarded the Henry K Beecher Award by The Hastings Center, where he is also an elected fellow. In 2011, Campbell was elected a Fellow of the Royal Society of Edinburgh. In 2018, the Singaporean Government awarded him the Public Service Medal (Friends of Singapore) as part of its National Day Awards.
