= Anatomical Sciences Education =

Anatomy education scientific journal

- Cover of February 2026 special issue of Anatomical Sciences Education featuring qualitative research in health professions and sciences education
- Discipline: Anatomy, Education, Ethics, Clinical Training
- Language: English
- Edited by: Jason M. Organ

Publication details
- History: 4 December 2007 – present
- Publisher: Wiley (USA)
- Frequency: Bimonthly
- Open access: Hybrid
- Impact factor: 4.7 ▼ (2024)

Standard abbreviations
- ISO 4: Anat. Sci. Educ.
- NLM: Anat Sci Educ

Indexing
- CODEN: ASECAX
- ISSN: 1935-9772 (print); 1935-9780 (web)
- LCCN: 2007214218
- OCLC no.: 2007214218

Links
- Journal homepage; Online access; Online archive

Anatomical Sciences Education is a peer-reviewed journal that provides an international forum for the exchange of ideas, opinions, innovations and research on topics related to education in the anatomical sciences of gross anatomy, embryology, histology, and neurosciences at all levels of anatomical sciences education including, undergraduate, graduate, post-graduate, allied health, medical (both allopathic and osteopathic), and dental. It is one of the three official publication of the American Association for Anatomy.

According to the Journal Citation Reports, the journal has a 2020 impact factor of 5.958, ranking it 3rd out of 45 journals in the category "Education, Scientific Disciplines".

In 2025, the journal's special issue, The Intersection of Anatomy & Spirituality, won an APEX 2025 Award for Publication Excellence.

== Top outputs ==
As of February 2026, the top five articles according to their Altmetric attention score are:

1. Štrkalj, Goran; Pather, Nalini (September 2020). "Beyond the Sex Binary: Toward the Inclusive Anatomical Sciences Education". Anatomical Sciences Education. 14 (4): 513–518. doi:10.1002/ase.2002. ISSN 1935-9772.
2. Husmann, Polly R.; O'Loughlin, Valerie Dean (March 2018). "Another Nail in the Coffin for Learning Styles? Disparities among Undergraduate Anatomy Students' Study Strategies, Class Performance, and Reported VARK Learning Styles". Anatomical Sciences Education. 12 (1): 6–19. doi:10.1002/ase.1777. ISSN 1935-9772.
3. Ghosh, Sanjib Kumar (August 2016). "Cadaveric dissection as an educational tool for anatomical sciences in the 21st century". Anatomical Sciences Education. 10 (3): 286–299. doi:10.1002/ase.1649. ISSN 1935-9772.
4. Taylor, Adam M.; Diggle, Peter; Wessels, Quenton (November 2017). "What do the public know about anatomy? Anatomy education to the public and the implications". Anatomical Sciences Education. 11 (2): 117–123. doi:10.1002/ase.1746. ISSN 1935-9772.
5. Caplan, Ilan; DeCamp, Matthew (January 2019). "Of Discomfort and Disagreement: Unclaimed Bodies in Anatomy Laboratories at United States Medical Schools". Anatomical Sciences Education. 12 (4): 360–369. doi:10.1002/ase.1853. ISSN 1935-9772.
