= Brian Lynch (public servant) =

New Zealand public servant and diplomat

Brian John Lynch ONZM (born 1936) is a former New Zealand public servant, diplomat, and director of the New Zealand Institute of International Affairs.

== Background ==
Lynch studied at the University of Canterbury. He was then a secondary teacher for three years. was Dux at Waimate High School

== Public service ==
Lynch joined the New Zealand Ministry of Foreign Affairs in 1964. He held various positions there until 1982. Lynch was Deputy Secretary of the Ministry of Transport from 1982 to 1992.

== Meat, trade and international affairs ==
Lynch was the Chief Executive of the Meat Industry Association from 1992 to 2003. "It was for his work in assisting the meat industry to rationalize and adjust to a very different commodity chain in the post-subsidy open market conditions of the 1990s that he was made Officer of the New Zealand Order of Merit in June 2004". Lynch joined the New Zealand Institute of International Affairs as their director that year. He was replaced in 2012 by Peter Kennedy.

== Honours ==
In the 2004 Queen's Birthday Honours, Lynch was appointed an Officer of the New Zealand Order of Merit, for public services and services to the meat industry.
