= The New Bioethics =

- Discipline: Bioethics
- Language: English
- Edited by: Matthew James

Publication details
- Former names: European Journal of Genetics in Society; Human Reproduction & Genetic Ethics
- History: 1995–present
- Publisher: Taylor & Francis
- Frequency: Quarterly
- Open access: Hybrid
- Impact factor: 1.3 (2023)

Standard abbreviations
- ISO 4: New Bioeth.

Indexing
- ISSN: 2050-2877 (print); 2050-2885 (web)
- LCCN: 2013228081
- OCLC no.: 865786143

Links
- Journal homepage

The New Bioethics is a quarterly peer-reviewed academic journal covering bioethics that was established in 1995 as European Journal of Genetics in Society, changing its name to Human Reproduction & Genetic Ethics in 1998, and taking its current name in 2011. It is published by Taylor & Francis and the editor-in-chief is Matthew James (St Mary's University, Twickenham). According to the Journal Citation Reports, the journal has a 2023 impact factor of 1.4.
