= Water in New Zealand =

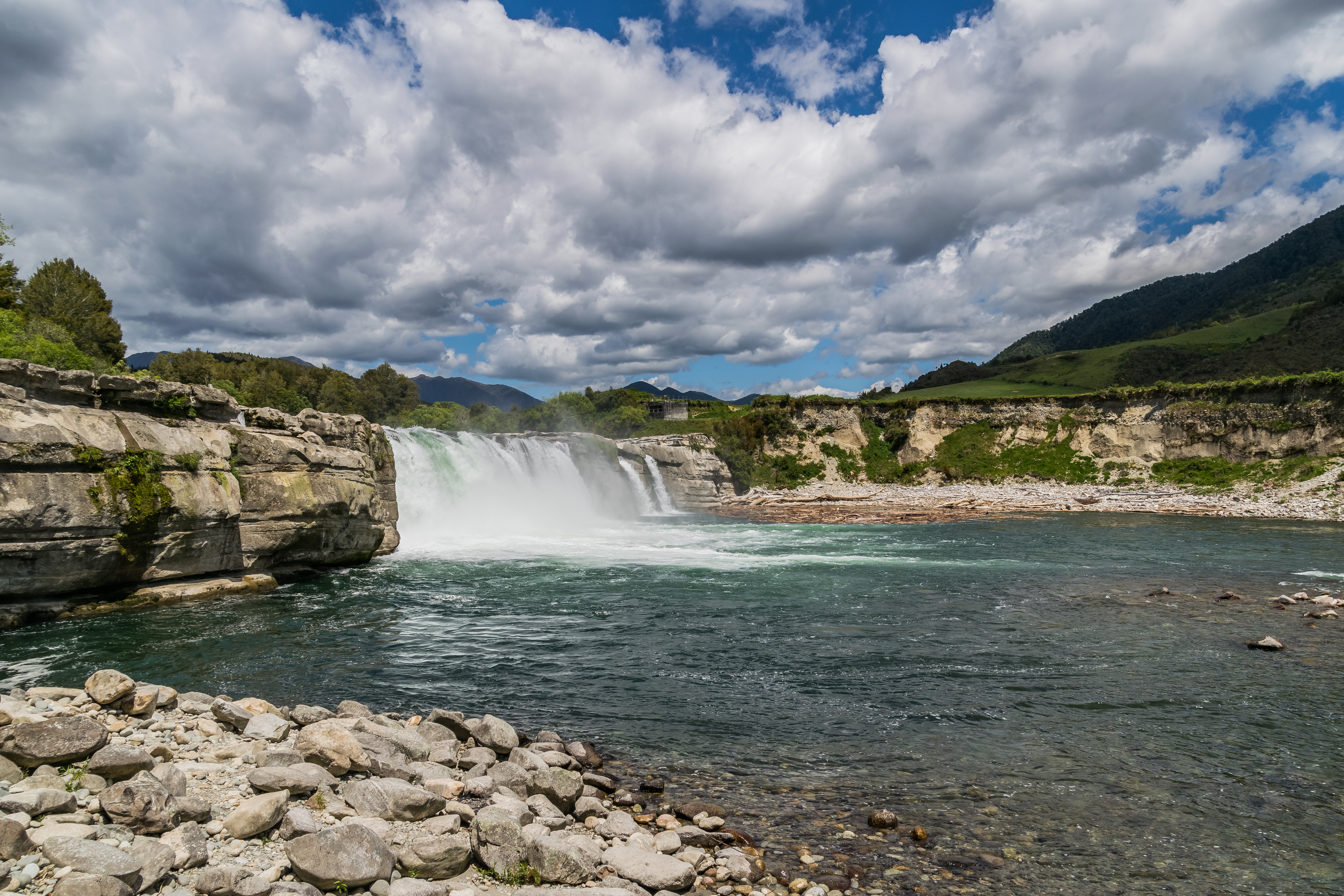
Maruia Falls on the Maruia River in Tasman Region

Water is relatively abundant in New Zealand due to the temperate climate and maritime weather patterns. In recent years, water pollution and draw-down of aquifers have become important environmental issues in New Zealand.

== Waters in New Zealand ==
In New Zealand, there are more than 425,000 km (264,000 mi) of rivers and streams and about 4,000 lakes and over 200 underground aquifers. Annual water flow is 145 million litres per person. The reliable supply of good water is an important economic advantage for New Zealand, but its quality and availability is declining.

=== Lakes ===
There are 3,820 lakes in New Zealand with a surface area larger than 1 hectare (2.5 acres), and are of varying types and origins. Many of the lakes in the central North Island area are volcanic crater lakes, while the majority of the lakes near the Southern Alps were carved by glaciers. Hydroelectric reservoirs are common in South Canterbury, Central Otago and along the Waikato River.

=== Rivers and streams ===
Over 180,000 km (110,000 mi) of rivers has been mapped in New Zealand, the longest being the Waikato River with a length of 425 kilometres and the largest river by volume is the Clutha River with a mean discharge of 614 cubic metres per second.

=== Waterfalls ===
New Zealand has many notable waterfalls, some of which are regularly visited by tourists. Huka Falls on the Waikato River is one such waterfall. Sutherland Falls is usually regarded as the highest waterfall in New Zealand at 580 metres high but Browne Falls cascades 619 m or 836 m depending on what is considered to be the source. The Maruia Falls on the Maruia River are a relatively new waterfall formed as a result of the 1929 Murchison earthquake.

== Hydrology of New Zealand ==
The average annual precipitation for New Zealand as a whole is 2.1 m (6 ft 11 in). In mountain portions of the West Coast, it exceeds 10 m per year. The distribution of precipitation across the country is determined by its location with the mid-southern latitudes and its topography. Seasonal differences in precipitation are substantial, regularly leading to summer water deficits in many parts of the country, though the season of greatest and least precipitation differs from region to region. The amount of precipitation also varies interannually in response to both El Niño–Southern Oscillation and Interdecadal Pacific Oscillation cycles.

== Water resource use ==
Water resources are used for a number of purposes, including hydroelectricity generation, irrigation, and municipal water supply. Approximately 2% of New Zealand's freshwater resource is allocated for consumptive use.

=== Supply to consumers ===
The supply of water to consumers is provided by local government territorial authorities, which include city councils in urban areas and district councils in rural areas. The legal framework includes the Health Act 1956, amended in 2007, the Local Government Act 2002 and the Resource Management Act 1991.

== Water resource management ==
=== Legislation ===
The Resource Management Act 1991 governs the use of water (and other natural resources). A resource consent is required for taking, damming, discharging and diverting water. There is a National Policy Statement for Freshwater Management.

== Hydrological and water resource changes ==
In modern times, the quantity, quality and timing of water within New Zealand has been changing. Principal causes have been abstraction, impoundment, land use and land cover change, and agricultural and industrial runoff.

=== Pollution ===
Water pollution in New Zealand is becoming an increasing concern for environmentalists and for regulatory bodies.

An increase in dairy farming is linked to an increase in water pollution, and siltation due to land clearance has affected lakes, rivers, caves and bays. There are more than 800 water quality monitoring sites around New Zealand that are regularly sampled.

== Organisations ==
Various organisations in New Zealand are involved with water and its use. Regional Councils have the statutory responsibility for water.

- Fish and Game New Zealand, a statutory body set up to advocate for recreational hunting and fishing, has taken a stance on water pollution. It started a "dirty dairying" campaign to highlight the effect of farming on water quality.
- Forest & Bird, a long established conservation organisation, has become involved with water issues due to increasing concern about the effects of pollution on freshwater ecosystems.
- Freshwater Sciences Society aims to facilitate liaison between all persons interested in fresh and brackish water
- The Hydrological Society of New Zealand was set up in 1961 to "further the science of hydrology and its application to the understanding and management of New Zealand's water resources".
- Land Air Water Aotearoa was established by regional councils, research institutes and government entities to find the balance between using natural resources and maintaining their quality and availability.
- The Land and Water Forum brings together a wide range of entities with a stake in freshwater and land.
- The Waterways Centre, opened in 2010, was established as a collaboration between University of Canterbury and Lincoln University to address freshwater management.
- The Freshwater Planning Process, established by the Resource Management Amendment Act 2020, is facilitated by the Office of the Chief Freshwater Commissioner.

== See also ==
- Water supply and sanitation in New Zealand
- Glaciers of New Zealand
- Coastline of New Zealand
- Sustainable Water Programme of Action
- Environment of New Zealand
