= Lisa Matisoo-Smith =

New Zealand biological anthropologist

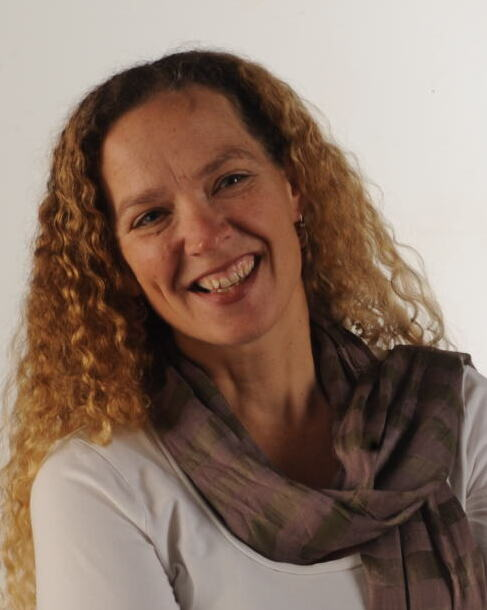
- Lisa Matisoo-Smith in 2011
- Born: 1963 (age 62–63)
- Education: University of Auckland
- Scientific career
- Fields: molecular anthropology
- Workplaces: University of Otago
- Thesis: No hea te kiore : MtDNA variation in Rattus exulans : a model for human colonisation and contact in prehistoric Polynesia (1996)

Elizabeth Anne Matisoo-Smith (born 1963) is a molecular anthropologist and Professor at the University of Otago. As at 2018, she is Head of the Department of Anatomy.

== Biography ==
Matisoo-Smith was born in Hawai‘i in 1963. Her father Andres Matisoo was born in Estonia. He moved with his family to the United States, where he later met Lisa's American mother Julie. Matisoo-Smith also lived in Japan and California, following her father's naval postings. She is married to New Zealander Brent Smith.

She completed her doctoral thesis No hea te kiore : MtDNA variation in Rattus exulans : a model for human colonisation and contact in prehistoric Polynesia at the University of Auckland in 1996.

Matisoo-Smith's research focuses on using DNA to map human migration, especially in the Pacific. She is a principal investigator on National Geographic's Genographic project. As part of that project, she is the lead researcher for From Africa to Aotearoa, which is looking specifically at human migration to New Zealand.

She is a Fellow of The Royal Society of New Zealand. In 2017, Matisoo-Smith was selected as one of the Royal Society Te Apārangi's "150 women in 150 words", celebrating the contributions of women to knowledge in New Zealand. In 2018, she was awarded the society's Mason Durie Medal for social science, recognising her research into Polynesian migration across the Pacific. In 2022 she was appointed a distinguished professor at the University of Otago.
