= Bjørn Hofmann =

Norwegian medical researcher (born 1964)

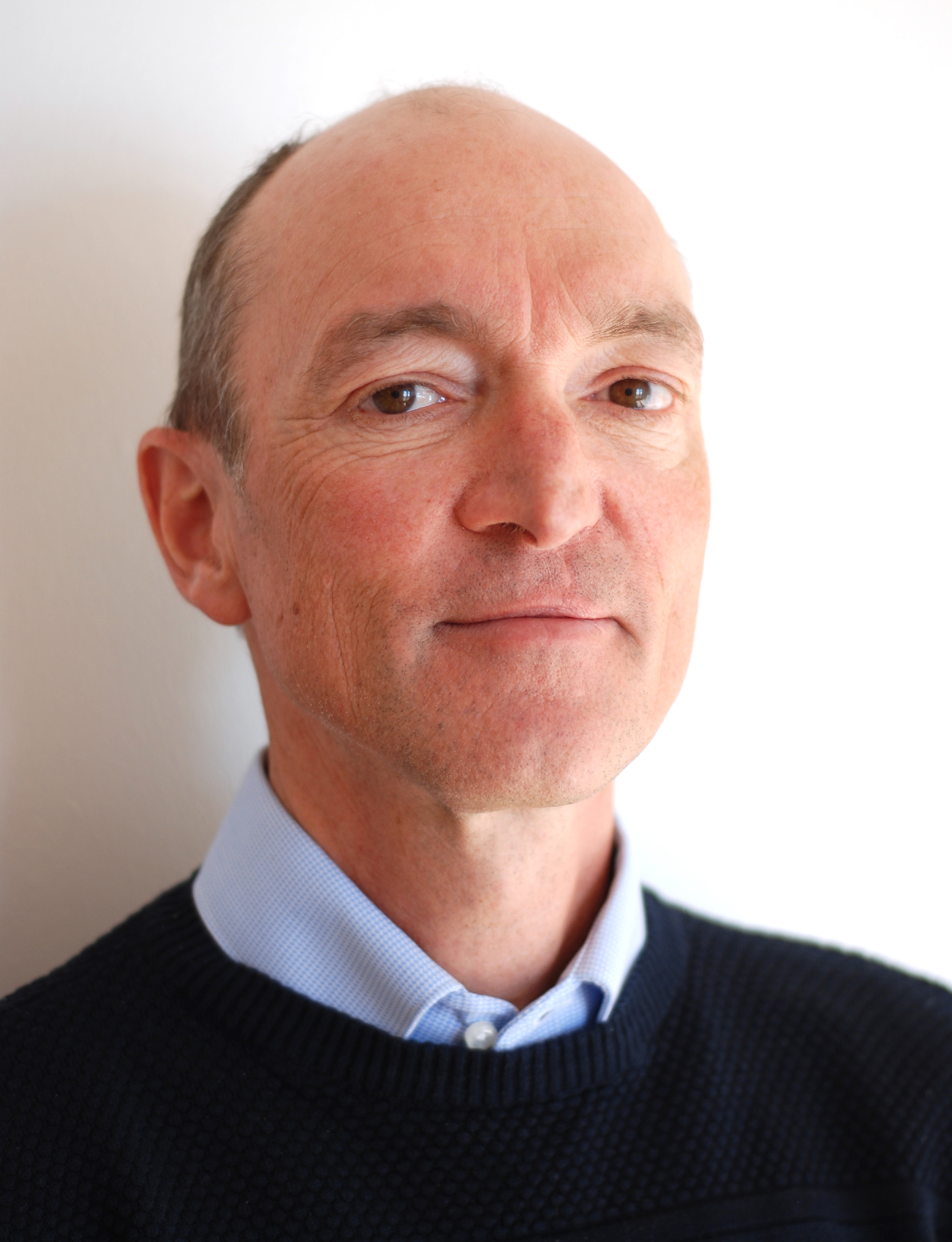
- Hofmann in 2019
- Born: 20 July 1964 (age 61); Norway
- Occupations: Professor at the Department of Health, Technology and Society at the Norwegian University of Science and Technology

Bjørn Morten Hofmann (born in Oslo, 20 July 1964) is a Norwegian researcher in philosophy of medicine and ethics with special interest for the relationship between epistemology and ethics.

His main subjects in the philosophy of medicine have been the concepts of health and disease. In the philosophy of medicine he has studied causation, rationality, evidence, bias, diagnosis, overdiagnosis, medicalization and futility. Reproductive technologies, biobanks, organ transplantation, organoids, and artificial intelligence (AI/ML) have been his main topics in the ethics of biotechnologies. Additionally, Hofmann has published in research ethics, ethics in health technology assessment (HTA), medical ethics, health services research, and science and technology studies.

== Education and professional career ==
Hofmann was trained in the natural sciences at the Norwegian University of Science and Technology (Norges Tekniske Høgskole) where he studied physical electronics and biomedical engineering and graduated in 1989. After his studies, he worked with Medical Technology at Lillehammer county hospital and with health applications at Telenor Research. He studied history of ideas at the university of Oslo 1991 and philosophy at the University of Tromsø in 1993 and 1994. Hofmann got his PhD in philosophy of medicine from the University of Oslo in 2002.

Hofmann has been working as a professor of philosophy of medicine and ethics at the Centre for medical ethics at the University of Oslo and at the Norwegian University of Science and Technology at Gjøvik. He has also been a researcher at the Norwegian Knowledge Centre for the Health Services from 2004 to 2013. Hofmann was a Harkness fellow at the Dartmouth College in the United States, 2014–2015.

== Publications ==
=== Books ===
- Hofmann B, Oftestad E, Magelssen M. Hva vil vi med fosterdiagnostikk? Fosterdiagnostikkens etikk. [On the ethics of prenatal testing.] Oslo:Cappelen Damm, 2021
- Hofmann B. Hva er sykdom? What is disease? Gyldendal Akademisk, 2008, 2014.
- Solbakk JH, Holm S, Hofmann B. The Ethics of Research Biobanking. Dordrecht Heidelberg London New York: Springer 2009 (ISBN 978-0-387-93871-4) 363 s
- Hofmann B. Infusjonsapparatur. Oslo: Universitetsforlaget, 1998. [Infusion Devices. Oslo: Scandinavian University Press, 1998]

=== Recent journal articles ===
- Recent journal articles

=== Citation ===
During the five years between 2019 and 2024 his articles have been cited more than 5000 times, according to Google Scholar (2024). His most cited papers are:

- Hofmann, B. "On the triad disease, illness and sickness". Journal of Medicine and Philosophy 2002; 27 (6): 651–674
- Hofmann, B. "Toward a procedure for integrating moral issues in health technology assessment." International Journal of Technology Assessment in Health Care 2005;21(3):312-18.
- Hofmann, B. "Broadening consent and diluting ethics." Journal of Medical Ethics 2009; 35(2): 125–129.
- Hofmann, B. "Is there a technological imperative in health care?" International Journal of Technology Assessment in Health Care 2002; 18(3): 675–689.

== Sources ==
- Bergstrøm, Ida (31. mai 2013) «Professor pipelort». In: På Høyden (Norwegian)
- Hofmann, Bjørn (2004)«Hva er sykdom?» In: Sykepleien, nr. 2 (Norwegian)
- Hofmann's profile pages at UiO and NTNU (English)
