= New Zealand Hydrological Society =

- Abbreviation: NZHS
- Formation: 1961; 65 years ago
- Region served: New Zealand
- Fields: Hydrology
- Website: hydrologynz.org.nz

The New Zealand Hydrological Society (NZHS) is a non-profit organisation founded in 1961 to further the science of hydrology and its application to the understanding and management of New Zealand's water resources. The society is a constituent body of the Royal Society of New Zealand.

The society publishes the Journal of Hydrology (New Zealand) twice a year, since 1962.
