= Hallie Buckley =

New Zealand bioarchaeologist

Hallie Buckley FRSNZ
- Education: University of Otago
- Awards: Mason Durie Medal (2022)
- Scientific career
- Fields: Bioarchaeology
- Workplaces: University of Otago
- Thesis: Health and disease in the prehistoric Pacific Islands (2001)

Hallie Ruth Buckley is a New Zealand bioarchaeologist and professor at the University of Otago.

== Career ==
Buckley completed her PhD at the University of Otago in 2001, with a thesis titled Health and disease in the prehistoric Pacific Islands. She then joined the faculty at Otago, and was appointed a full professor in 2017.

Buckley's research involves the chemical, bio-chemical and DNA analysis of human and animal remains. She has worked extensively at the archaeological site of Teouma, but her highest-profile work to date was on St John's Cemetery in Tokoiti, near Milton. The cemetery, holding mainly the remains of first-generation immigrants from the United Kingdom buried between 1860 and 1926, had already been extensively researched by a local community group. Buckley's team examined remains from unmarked graves and used a range of scientific techniques to match them with historical records. As of 2018, she was planning a similar project on the Chinese cemetery at Lawrence.

== Honours and awards ==
In 2019, Buckley was awarded a James Cook Research Fellowship for bioarchaeological research into 19th century miners and settlers. In 2022, Buckley was awarded the Mason Durie Medal by the Royal Society Te Apārangi, for "transforming the way we conceptualise the biomedical history of the ancestors of modern Polynesians, and ground-breaking discoveries of ancient disease in Asia". Also in 2022, she was elected a Fellow of the Royal Society of New Zealand.

== Selected publications ==
- Bentley, R. Alexander, Hallie R. Buckley, Matthew Spriggs, Stuart Bedford, Chris J. Ottley, Geoff M. Nowell, Colin G. Macpherson, and D. Graham Pearson. "Lapita migrants in the Pacific's oldest cemetery: isotopic analysis at Teouma, Vanuatu." American Antiquity 72, no. 4 (2007): 645–656.
- Tayles, Nancy, and Hallie R. Buckley. "Leprosy and tuberculosis in Iron Age southeast Asia?." American Journal of Physical Anthropology 125, no. 3 (2004): 239–256.
- Buckley, Hallie R. "Subadult health and disease in prehistoric Tonga, Polynesia." American Journal of Physical Anthropology 113, no. 4 (2000): 481–505.
- Bedford, Stuart, Matthew Spriggs, Hallie R. Buckley, Frederique Valentin, and Ralph Regenvanu. "The Teouma Lapita site, South Efate, Vanuatu: a summary of three field seasons (2004-2006)." (2009).
- Valentin, Frédérique, Hallie R. Buckley, Estelle Herrscher, Rebecca Kinaston, Stuart Bedford, Matthew Spriggs, Stuart Hawkins, and Ken Neal. "Lapita subsistence strategies and food consumption patterns in the community of Teouma (Efate, Vanuatu)." Journal of Archaeological Science 37, no. 8 (2010): 1820–1829.
