= AKF =

AKF may refer to:

- Aga Khan Foundation, a private, not-for-profit international development agency
- Al-Khair Foundation, an international Muslim aid non-governmental organization based in the United Kingdom
- American Kidney Fund, a medical non-profit organization based in the United States
- Animal Kingdom Foundation, an animal welfare group based in the Philippines
- Asian Karatedo Federation, a sports federation that, among other things, organizes the Asian Karate Championships
- Australian Koala Foundation, an Australian non-profit scientific organization
