= Thai Society for the Prevention of Cruelty to Animals =

Thai animal welfare organization

The Thai Society for the Prevention of Cruelty to Animals (TSPCA) is a Thai animal welfare organisation. The society was instrumental in the passing of Thailand's first animal welfare legislation, the Prevention of Animal Cruelty and Provision of Animal Welfare Act B.E. 2557 in 2014.

== TSPCA objectives ==
1. To instill in young people and the general public, a better understanding of animal needs and rights—encouraging a culture of kindness, care, and understanding
2. To provide education, accurate information, guidance, and advice on animal care requirements
3. To campaign for the prevention of cruelty to animals, and for improved legislation for their protection
4. To work in collaboration with other organisations, governmental and private, in Thailand or internationally, in the achievement of similar aims
5. To support animal care-givers in their collective or individual work
6. To work to conserve nature and the environment

To meet these objectives, the TSPCA has initiated a number of on-going projects.

== See also ==
- Animal welfare and rights in Thailand
