= Soi Dog Foundation =

Thai nonprofit organisation

- Formation: 2003
- Founder: Margot Homburg Park; John Dalley MBE; Gill Dalley
- Type: Nonprofit organisation
- Registration no.: Phor.Gor. 39/2548 (Thailand)
- Headquarters: Phuket, Thailand
- Region served: Asia
- Fields: Animal welfare
- Director/manager: John Dalley MBE
- Website: soidog.org

Soi Dog Foundation is a nonprofit organisation dedicated to improving the welfare of stray dogs and cats across Asia. Its headquarters is in Phuket, Thailand, and it is a legally registered nonprofit organisation in Thailand, US, Canada, Australia, France, UK, Switzerland, and the Netherlands. Its primary goal is to care for homeless and abused dogs in Thailand.

The organisation was established by British couple John and Gill Dalley, with the help of Margot Homburg Park, in Phuket in 2003. Its name, "Soi Dog", is derived from the Thai word soi, meaning "street", reflecting its mission to care for the street dogs and cats of Thailand. The Dalleys were inspired to start the foundation after witnessing the dire condition of stray animals in Phuket.

Soi Dog's efforts include spaying and neutering to prevent unwanted litters, and providing rescue, vaccination, medical treatment, shelter, and adoption services for animals unable to return to the streets.

The foundation has saved thousands of dogs from illegal trades, particularly for meat, and works to reduce free-ranging dog and cat populations through sterilisation.

It has received endorsement from international celebrities, including Judi Dench, Laura Carmichael, Peter Egan, and Ricky Gervais. The foundation's 2014 campaign led to the enactment of the Prevention of Animal Cruelty and Provision of Animal Welfare Act, the first animal welfare act in Thailand.

== Background and origin ==
Thailand, and other countries in Southeast Asia, are known for their stray dog populations. Seeing the appalling situation in Thailand, American-born Margot Homburg Park decided to join hands with a British couple, John and Gill Dalley, to try and end the dogs' suffering. In 2003, the trio established Soi Dog Foundation by opening a clinic and recruiting veterinarians on a volunteer basis to take care of homeless dogs. For their name, they chose the Thai word soi, which means "street", or "alley".

John Dalley is a retired chemical engineer from Leeds, England, and Gill was a former bank employee. The couple had moved to Phuket for a retired life. John has stated: "We had a dog back home [in Leeds], but I wasn't particularly involved with animal rights. But you see these dogs [in Thailand] suffer, and you want to do something to help them."

They began by neutering and vaccinating stray dogs. Every year, Soi Dog spays/neuters and vaccinates tens of thousands of stray dogs and cats throughout Thailand, and in 2023, it surpassed the milestone of one million animals neutered since 2003.

In 2006, due to ill health, Margot returned to Bangkok, leaving Gill and John to lead the foundation.

In 2011, a permanent clinic was opened in Bangkok, the nation's capital. As a result of the foundation's vaccination effort, Phuket has seen only one confirmed case of rabies since 1995, in 2019.

In 2017, Soi Dog launched a humane education programme, which totalled 15,058 students and 861 teachers by 2020. This led to the establishment of a school in Phuket, the Humane Education Centre, on 23 November 2020.

Gill died after a short battle with cancer on 13 February 2017.

== Activity ==
The primary mission of Soi Dog Foundation is to improve the welfare of stray dogs and cats in Asia, particularly in Thailand.

=== Dog meat trade ===
Until 2014, Thailand was known for its dog meat trade, with many animals being exported to Vietnam and China. Thailand's largest island, Phuket, is the location of the Soi Dog Foundation's Gill Dalley Sanctuary, where many former meat trade rescues have been sheltered, rehabilitated, and eventually rehomed through Soi Dog's international adoption programme. As of April 2024, it was home to more than 1,800 former stray and at-risk dogs and cats.

Soi Dog has been dedicated to combating the dog and cat meat trades in Asia. Throughout the past two decades, they have rescued thousands of animals. Soi Dog successfully eliminated the dog meat trade in Thailand and has also expanded its efforts to neighbouring countries, including Cambodia, the Philippines, Vietnam, and other Southeast Asian countries where this issue is widespread.

=== Spay/neuter ===
Between 2003 and 2020, the stray animal population of Phuket was reduced by about 90%.

The foundation has eighteen mobile spay/neuter and vaccination clinics across Thailand that primarily focus on the Catch, Neuter, Vaccinate, Return (CNVR) programme. In 2023, Soi Dog surpassed the milestone of one million animals neutered and vaccinated since 2003. As of April 2024, they had neutered and vaccinated 1,177,730 dogs and cats, making their CNVR programme the largest of its kind in the world.

=== Research ===
The foundation provides research assistance to epidemiological studies of rabies, parasitic (filarial) infections, leptospirosis, as well as drug (anaesthetic) effects.

== Support ==
British celebrities Judi Dench, Laura Carmichael, Peter Egan, Penelope Wilton, and Ricky Gervais launched a public campaign to support the foundation in 2014. This proved a success in terms of political action: the National Assembly of Thailand passed its first animal welfare bill on 13 December 2014. On 27 December, the government enacted the Prevention of Animal Cruelty and Provision of Animal Welfare Act, which was the first animal welfare act in Thailand.

In 2005, Humane Society International gave $10,000 to the Soi Dog Foundation for rabies vaccination.

Thai entrepreneur Bright Vachirawit is also a supporter who regularly donates to Soi Dog, with his fan clubs actively contributing, especially during his "Make a Bright Wish" birthday campaign. Singer and actor Chinawut Indracusin and his family adopted a dog and a three-legged cat from Soi Dog. He actively promotes the #adoptdontshop movement. Although he was eliminated in the second round of MasterChef Celebrity Thailand, where he competed to win a one-million-baht prize for Soi Dog,

Apart from the officials in the foundation, honorary ambassadors include Naomi Bromley, a British vegan campaigner; Dena Kaplan, an Australian actress, singer, and dancer; Natalie Glebova, a Russian-Canadian model, writer, and holder of the Miss Universe 2005 title; and Kyle Leask, an autistic boy, and his dog Miracle, winner of the Eukanuba Friends for Life award. In 2019, Thai-British actor Peter Denman was appointed Grand Ambassador of the foundation.

== Awards and honours ==
In 2011, Gill Dalley was named the first Asia Pacific Canine hero for her work with Soi Dog Foundation.

In 2014, the Soi Dog Foundation received the Thailand Green Excellence Award, conferred by Princess Ubol Ratana. The award was instituted by the Tourism Authority of Thailand and managed by Wanderlust Travel Media. The judges remarked: "Soi Dog Foundation demonstrates what a big difference one small organisation can make". In 2023, the foundation's short film Love Will Always Triumph Over Evil, which depicted the story of Cola, a puppy whose front legs were amputated with a sword by an angry man, received the British Charity Film Award in London.

In 2020, John Dalley was included in the Queen's Birthday Honours List and was awarded the Most Excellent Order of the British Empire for his work with the foundation.

In 2023, Soi Dog was named Best Animal Welfare in Asia Non-Profit Organisation by Acquisition International.

== See also ==
- Street dogs in Thailand
- Animal welfare in Thailand
