= John Dalley (animal welfare campaigner) =

British animal welfare campaigner (born c. 1949)

John Dalley MBE
- Born: 1948 or 1949 (age 76–77); Leeds, England
- Occupations: Chemical engineer (retired); animal welfare campaigner
- Years active: 2003–present
- Known for: Co-founding the Soi Dog Foundation
- Title: President, Soi Dog Foundation International
- Spouse: Gill Dalley (m. 1996; died 2017)
- Awards: MBE (2020)

John Dalley MBE (born c. 1949) is a British animal welfare campaigner and retired chemical engineer who co-founded the Soi Dog Foundation, a charity for street dogs and cats based in Phuket, Thailand. He founded the organisation in 2003 with his wife, Gill Dalley, and Margot Homburg, and has led it since 2006. Dalley campaigned against the illegal dog meat trade in Thailand and was involved in drafting the country's first animal welfare law, passed in 2014. He was appointed a Member of the Order of the British Empire (MBE) in the 2020 Birthday Honours for services to animal welfare.

== Early life and career ==
Dalley is from Leeds in West Yorkshire, England. He worked in the chemicals industry as a chemical engineer and chemical plant manager. He married Gill, a former bank employee, in Phuket in 1996.

== Soi Dog Foundation ==
Dalley and his wife took early retirement and moved from Yorkshire to Phuket in 2003, having seen the island's stray animal problem on earlier holidays. Neither had prior experience in animal welfare. Dalley later said: "I was going to spend my retirement in Thailand playing golf and diving." With Dutch expatriate Margot Homburg, who was already sterilising dogs in Bangkok, the couple founded the Soi Dog Foundation. The charity focused on mass sterilisation and vaccination as a long-term way to reduce the stray population.

In 2004 Gill Dalley contracted septicaemia while rescuing a dog and had both lower legs amputated. She returned to Phuket shortly before the 2004 Indian Ocean earthquake and tsunami and helped lead the foundation's rescue work with animals displaced by the disaster.

Dalley has directed the foundation since 2006. While his wife concentrated on the sterilisation programme and the design of the foundation's hospital and shelter, Dalley concentrated on the illegal trade in dogs exported for meat from north-eastern Thailand to Vietnam. As described in The Christian Science Monitor in 2015, the foundation paid informants for tips on dog thieves in Sakon Nakhon province, worked with police to intercept trucks carrying stolen dogs, and ran shelters in Buriram province and on Phuket for rescued animals. Dalley said that "one thing I want to do before I die is to end the dog meat trade."

Dalley lobbied Thai lawmakers for animal welfare legislation and was consulted on, and helped draft, Thailand's first animal welfare law, enacted in 2014. According to Khaosod English, he was one of few foreigners to have addressed the Thai Parliament.

Gill Dalley died of cancer in February 2017, aged 58. Dalley continued to lead the foundation and set up Soi Dog Foundation International as a parent organisation to oversee its expansion beyond Thailand. He also serves on the board of Soi Dog UK. In 2020 he published Just Gill: The Story of Gill Dalley, Co-founder of Soi Dog Foundation, a biography of his wife written with Donna Freelove and Barbara Young, with royalties going to the foundation.

By 2023 the foundation had sterilised and vaccinated more than one million dogs and cats.

== Honours ==
Dalley was appointed a Member of the Order of the British Empire (MBE) in the 2020 Queen's Birthday Honours, announced on 10 October 2020, for services to animal welfare in South East Asia. He dedicated the award to his late wife, saying: "I am just sorry that Gill could not be here to share it." He also said: "This is the work of 17 years, with thousands of donors and volunteers. It's nothing I could have done alone."

== Works ==
- Dalley, John; Freelove, Donna; Young, Barbara (2020). Just Gill: The Story of Gill Dalley, Co-founder of Soi Dog Foundation. Victorina Press. ISBN 978-1-83803-601-0.
