= Baileo =

Traditional houses of the Maluku Islands

The baileo or baileu is a traditional house in Maluku and North Maluku, Indonesia. The term is derived from the word bale or balai, which is a word for a 'village meeting place' in Malay, or baileu in Portuguese which means 'house'. The baileo is a representation of the Maluku culture and has an important function in the life of the community. That is why the structure forms part of the identity of any community in the Moluccas. There are instances where the baileo serves as a mosque or church or adjacent to one. This is the case when the house serves as a repository for sacred objects and a place of traditional ceremonies, in addition to its function as a place for community meetings.

The baileo, which is present in every Moluccan village, is usually a village landmark with its open architecture. It also has a large size and unique appearance when compared to other buildings in its vicinity. It is traditionally built from local materials such as planked timber, cement, stone or brick with wood shingle, and thatch or zinc roof.

Recent interest in baileo emerged within the recent revival process in parts of Indonesia that seeks to reestablish traditional institutions and symbols.

== Gallery ==
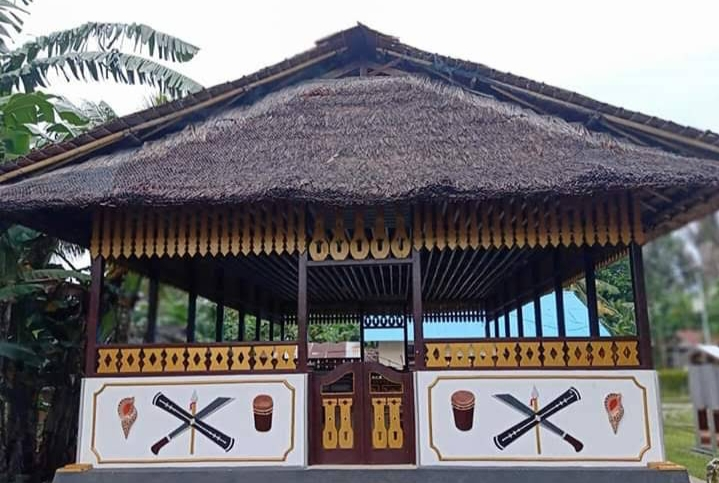
Baileo of Akoon village

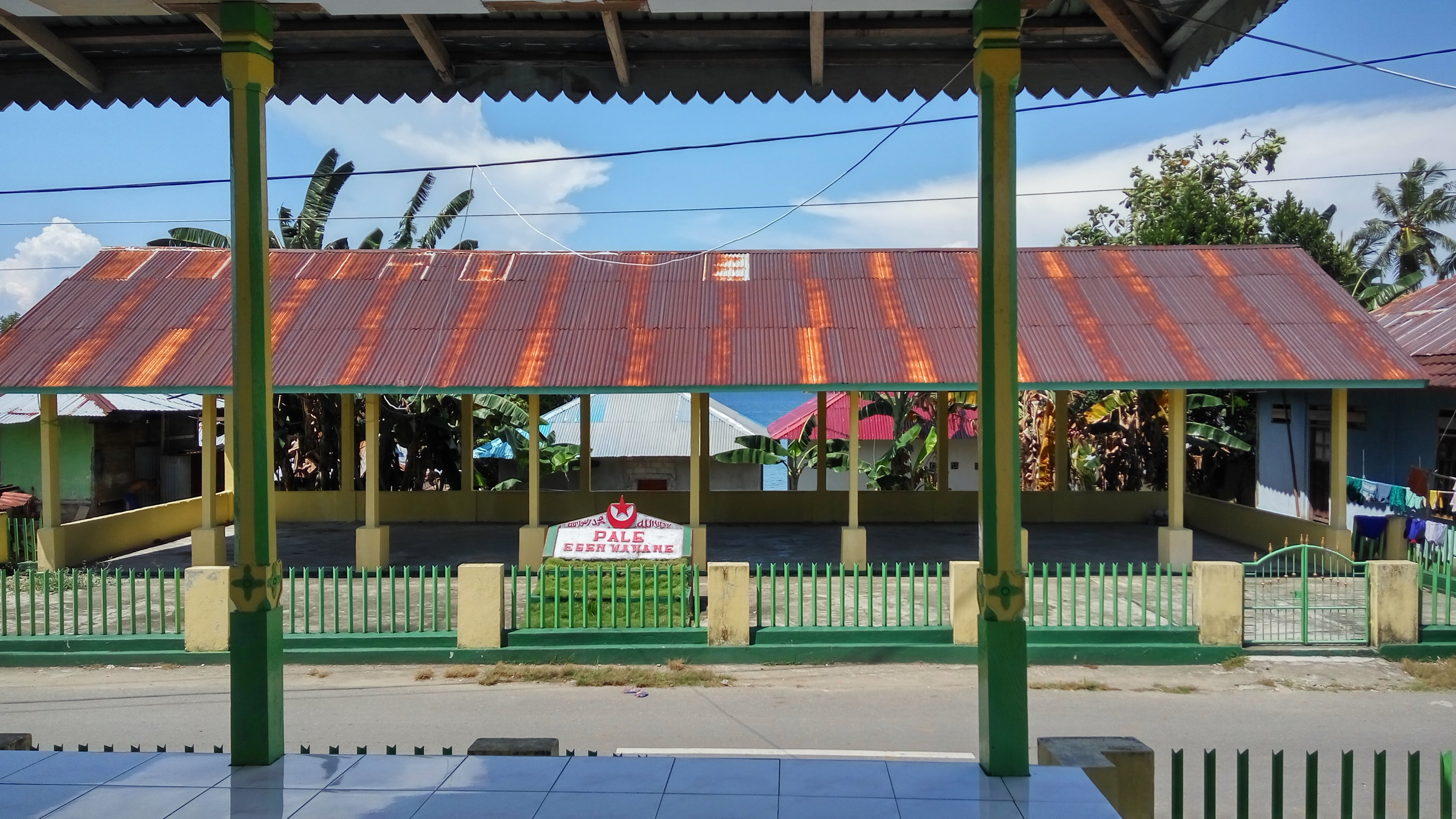
Baileo of Seith village

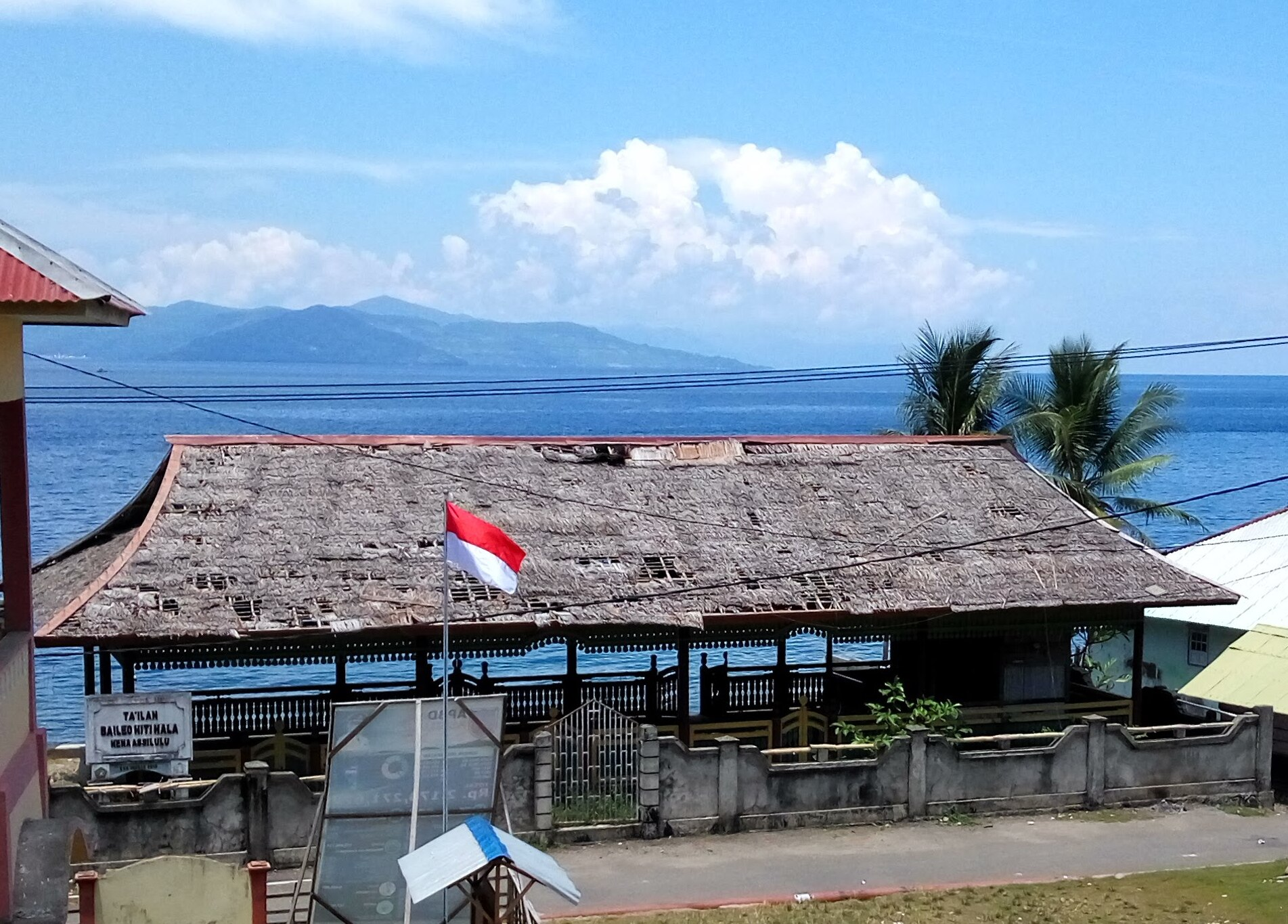
Baileo of Asilulu village

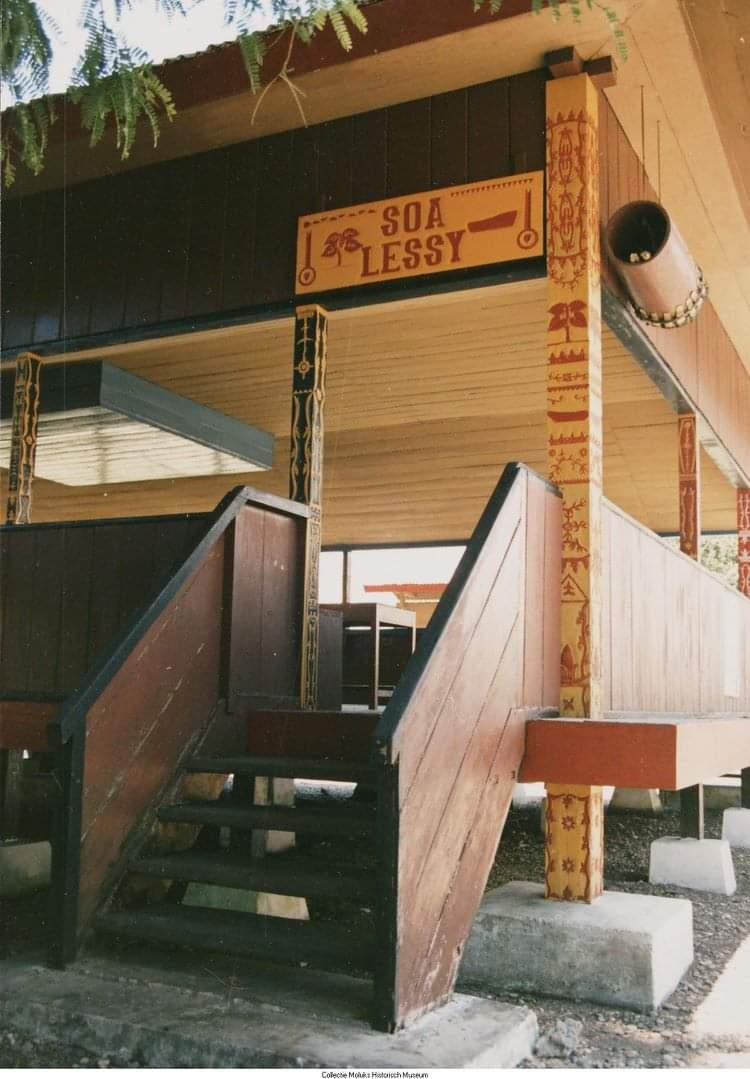
Baileo of Amahai village

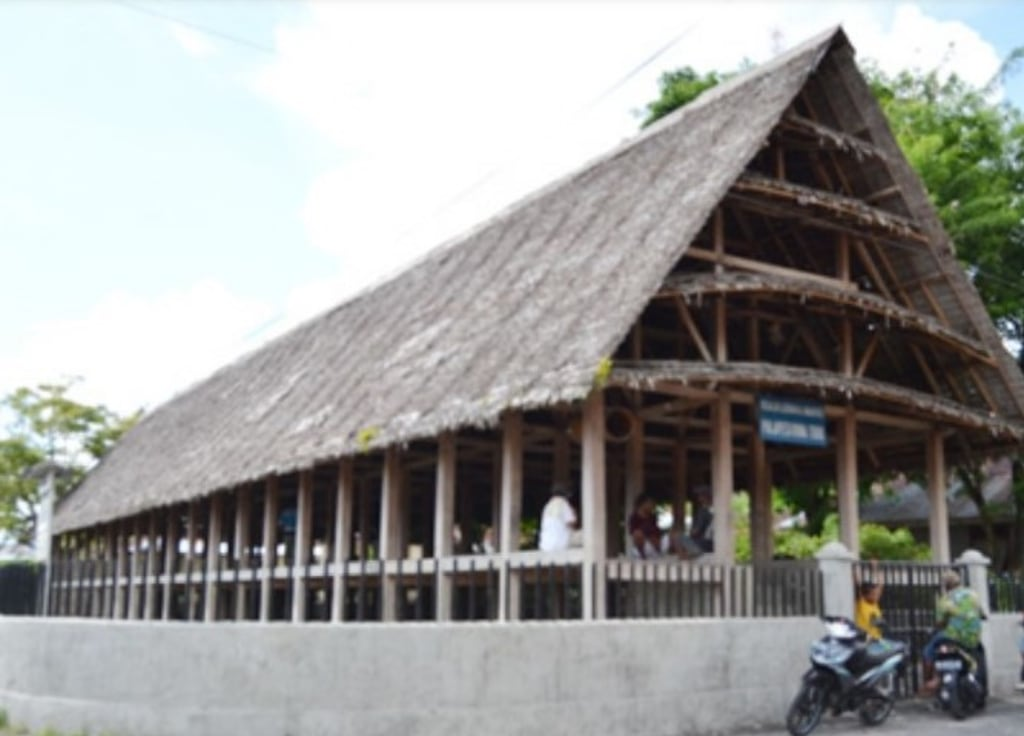
Baileo of Haria village

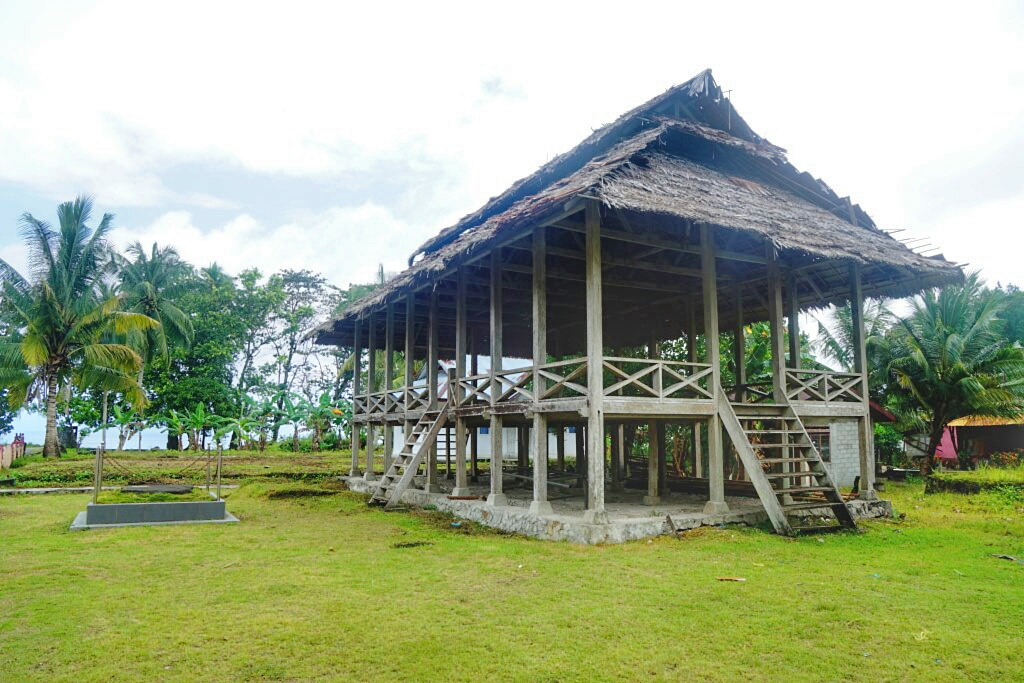
Baileo of Sirisori Amalatu village
