= Dog meat =

Meat from dogs used as food

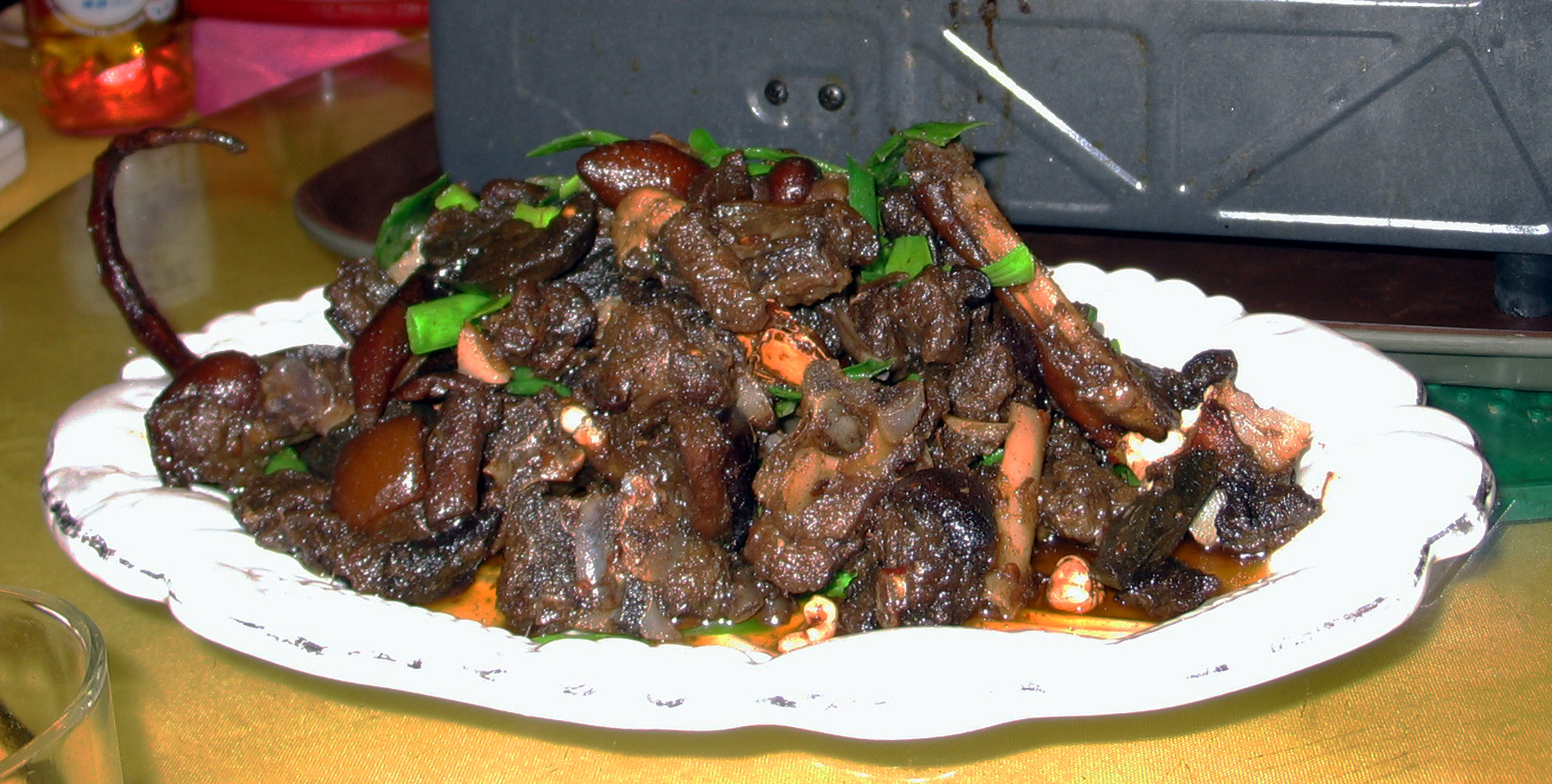
- Plate of cooked dog meat

Nutritional value per 100 g (3.5 oz)
- Energy: 1,096 kJ (262 kcal)
- Carbohydrates: 0.1 g
- Dietary fiber: 0 g
- Fat: 20.2 g
- Protein: 19 g
Vitamins and minerals
Vitamins	Quantity %DV^{†}
Vitamin A equiv.	0% 3.6 μg
Thiamine (B1)	10% 0.12 mg
Riboflavin (B2)	14% 0.18 mg
Niacin (B3)	12% 1.9 mg
Vitamin C	3% 3 mg
Minerals	Quantity %DV^{†}
Calcium	1% 8 mg
Iron	16% 2.8 mg
Phosphorus	13% 168 mg
Potassium	9% 270 mg
Sodium	3% 72 mg
- Other constituents: Quantity
- Water: 60.1 g
- Cholesterol: 44.4 mg
- Ash: 0.8 g
- ^{†}Percentages estimated using US recommendations for adults, except for potassium, which is estimated based on expert recommendation from the National Academies. Source: Yong-Geun Ann (1999)

Dog meat, also known as fragrant meat, or simply fragrant, is the meat derived from dogs. Historically, human consumption of dog meat has been recorded in many parts of the world.

In the 21st century, dog meat is consumed to a limited extent in Cambodia, China, Vietnam, parts of Northeastern India, Indonesia, Ghana, Laos, Nigeria, Korea and Switzerland. In these areas, the legality of dog meat consumption varies with some nations permitting it or lacking a nationwide ban. It was estimated in 2014 that worldwide, 25 million dogs were eaten each year by humans.

Some cultures view the consumption of dog meat as part of their traditional, ritualistic, or day-to-day cuisine, and other cultures consider consumption of dog meat a taboo, even where it had been consumed in the past. Opinions also vary drastically across different regions within different countries.

== Historical practices ==
=== Americas ===
==== Aztecs ====
In the Aztec Empire, Mexican hairless dogs were bred for many purposes. Hernán Cortés, an enemy of the Aztec, claimed in a letter that when he arrived in Tenochtitlan in 1519, "small gelded dogs which they breed for eating" were among the goods sold in the city markets. No other source corroborates this practice. These dogs, Xoloitzcuintles, were often depicted in pre-Columbian Mexican pottery. The breed was almost extinct in the 1940s, but the British military attaché in Mexico City, Norman Wright, developed a thriving breed from some of the dogs he found in remote villages. The genetic heritage of the breed has been almost erased through interbreeding with other dog breeds to keep its looks alive.

==== Native North Americans ====
The traditional culture surrounding the consumption of dog meat varied from tribe to tribe among the original inhabitants of North America, with some tribes relishing it as a delicacy, and others (such as the Comanche) treating it as a forbidden food. Native peoples of the Great Plains, such as the Sioux and Cheyenne, consumed it, but there was a concurrent religious taboo against the meat of wild canines.

The Kickapoo people include puppy meat in many of their traditional festivals. This practice has been well documented in the Works Progress Administration "Indian Pioneer History Project for Oklahoma".

On 20 December 2018, the federal Dog and Cat Meat Trade Prohibition Act was signed into law as part of the 2018 Farm Bill. It bans slaughtering dogs and cats for food in the United States, with exceptions for Native American rituals.

=== Europe ===
Ovid, Plutarch, Pliny, and other Latin authors, describe the sacrifice of puppies (catulina) to infernal deities, and for protection against grain-rust, the meat being subsequently prepared and consumed.

=== Austronesia ===
==== Indigenous Taiwanese ====
The Indigenous Taiwanese originally had taboos against eating dogs, which featured prominently in their cultural myths. The indigenous Taiwan Dog was deeply valued as a hunting companion. However, they also started consuming dog meat after it was introduced by incoming waishengren (mainlander) Han Chinese migrants in the mid-20th century, leading to the near-extinction of the Taiwan Dog.

==== Maritime Southeast Asia ====
Domesticated dogs were carried into the Philippines by the Neolithic Austronesian migrations from Taiwan, whose dogs in turn were acquired from the pre-Austronesian cultures in Neolithic southeastern China. Dog meat were consumed in some pre-colonial Philippine ethnic groups during certain shamanic rituals and special occasions. However, dog bones are very rarely found in middens in archaeological sites, in contrast to pig and deer remains; and most complete dog remains in archaeological sites are of dog burials near or beside human graves. This indicates that while dogs were sometimes eaten, they were primarily kept as companions and hunting dogs, and not as food animals. The Spanish historian Francisco Ignacio Alcina have detailed descriptions of the affectionate treatment of dogs by native Visayans in the 17th century, during the early Spanish colonial period. Alcina disapprovingly records that dogs were treated by locals like their own children. Thus, the rise in the consumption of dog meat as food in the secular context in some ethnic groups in the Philippines is likely to have only occurred some time after the arrival of the Spanish.

The tradition of eating dog meat for ritual purposes in some ethnic groups survived into the modern times in the Cordillera highlands of the Philippines. Among Cordillerans, dogs are sacrificed and eaten in a cleansing ritual known as dao-es or daw-es. The ritual is typically done after a person dies unexpectedly (through murder or an accident), gets severely ill, was released from prison, or witnessed death firsthand. Cordillerans believe that dogs have one of the purest souls among animals, comparable to humans, and thus they are the most appealing to the ancestor spirits (anito). The dog soul is sent as a messenger to the spirit world by a shaman (mambunong), which is believed to cleanse the minds of participants of images of death and evil spirits. These rituals are still legally permitted, though they are required to keep records and are overseen by the Committee on Animal Welfare.

==== Oceania ====
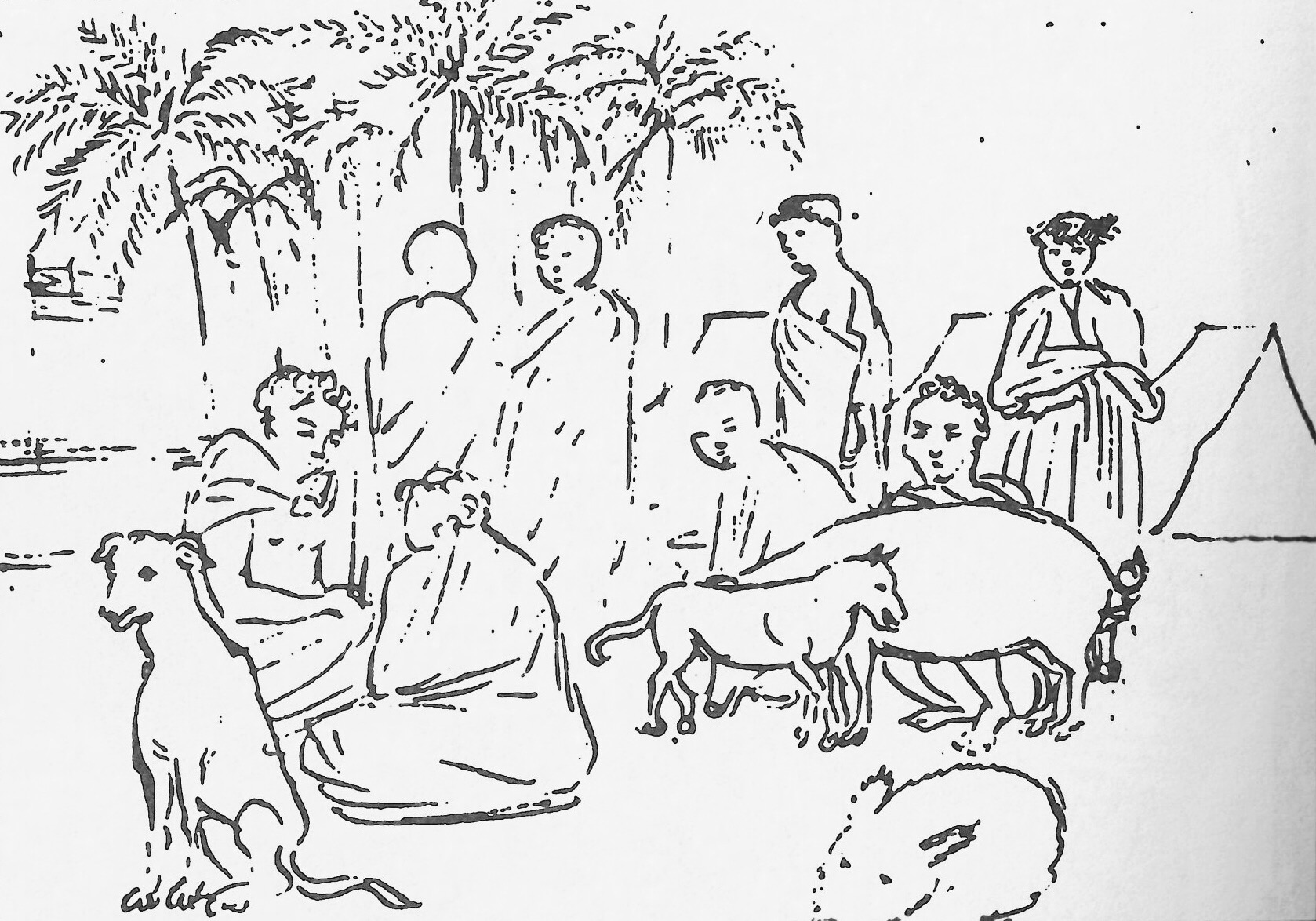
Extinct Hawaiian Poi Dog (center)

Dogs lost their economic importance as hunting animals (usually for wild boar) among Austronesians that reached the smaller islands in Melanesia and Polynesia. They became a competitor for limited food resources and thus were themselves eaten. The Austronesian domesticated dogs originally carried by the Lapita Culture migrations were eaten to extinction in many islands since ancient times. Dogs were reintroduced later on from surviving populations in other islands as well as dogs that descended from non-Austronesian Mainland Southeast Asian populations. This caused a marked discontinuity in the genes of domesticated dogs, as well as the terms for dogs, among Austronesians in the Pacific Islands, in comparison to other Austronesian regions in Island Southeast Asia.

Dogs were historically eaten in Tahiti and other islands of Polynesia, including Hawaii at the time of first European contact. James Cook, when first visiting Tahiti in 1769, recorded in his journal, "few were there of us but what allow'd that a South Sea Dog was next to an English Lamb, one thing in their favour is that they live entirely upon Vegetables". Calvin Schwabe reported in 1979 that dog was widely eaten in Hawaii and considered to be of higher quality than pork or chicken. When Hawaiians first encountered early British and American explorers, they were at a loss to explain the visitors' attitudes about dog meat. The Hawaiians raised both dogs and pigs as pets and for food. They could not understand why their British and American visitors only found the pig suitable for consumption. This practice seems to have died out, along with the native Hawaiian breed of dog, the unique Hawaiian Poi Dog, which was primarily used for this purpose.

Although Hawaii has outlawed commercial sales of dog meat, until the federal Dog and Cat Meat Trade Prohibition Act it was legal to slaughter an animal classified as a pet if it was "bred for human consumption" and done in a "humane" manner. This allowed dog meat trade to continue, mostly using stray, lost, or stolen dogs.

== Religious dietary laws ==
According to kashrut, Jewish dietary law, it is forbidden to consume the flesh of terrestrial mammals that do not chew their cud and have cloven hooves, which includes dogs.

In Islamic dietary laws, the consumption of the flesh of a dog, or any carnivorous animal, or any animal bearing fangs, claws, fingers or reptilian scales, is considered haram ("prohibited"), whereas the Maliki school deems it makruh ("disliked but not prohibited").

== Dogs as survival food ==
=== Wars and famines ===
In most European countries, the consumption of dog meat is taboo. Exceptions occurred in times of scarcity, such as sieges or famines.

In Germany, dog meat has been eaten in every major crisis since at least the time of Frederick the Great, and was commonly referred to as "blockade mutton".

During the 19th century westward movement in the United States, mountainmen, Native Americans, the U.S. Army, as well as the Confederacy during the American Civil War frequently had to sustain themselves on dog meat; the first to be consumed would be the horses, then the mules, and lastly the dogs.

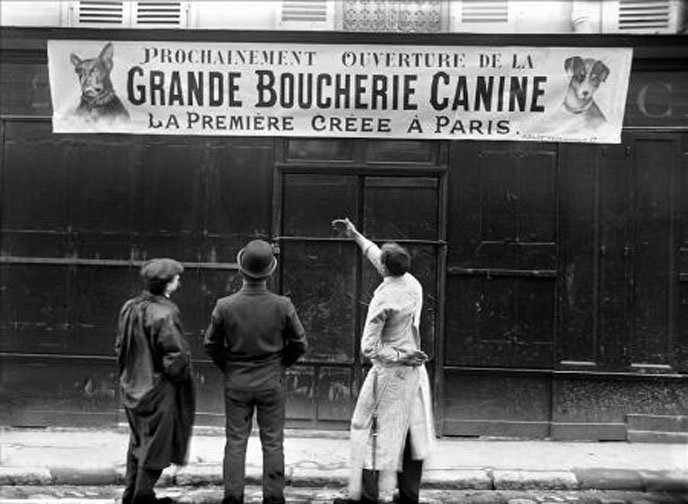
Photographic hoax showing the announced opening of a Great Dog Butchery, Paris, France, 1910

During the Siege of Paris (1870–1871), food shortages caused by the German blockade of the city caused the citizens of Paris to turn to alternative sources for food, including dog meat. Dog meat was also reported as being sold by some butchers in Paris in 1910.

In the early 20th century, high meat prices led to widespread consumption of horse and dog meat in Germany.

In the early 20th century in the United States, dog meat was consumed during times of meat shortage.

A few meat shops sold dog meat during the German occupation of Belgium in World War I, when food was scarce.

In the latter part of World War I, dog meat was being eaten in Saxony by the poorer classes because of famine conditions.

In Germany, the consumption of dog meat continued in the 1920s. In 1937, a meat inspection law targeted against trichinella was introduced for pigs, dogs, boars, foxes, badgers, and other carnivores.

During severe meat shortages coinciding with the German occupation from 1940 to 1945, sausages found to have been made of dog meat were confiscated by Nazi authorities in the Netherlands.

=== Expeditions and emergencies ===
Travelers sometimes have to eat their accompanying dogs to survive when stranded without other food. For example, Benedict Allen ate his dog when lost in the Brazilian rainforest. A case in Canada was reported in 2013.

==== Lewis and Clark ====
During the Lewis and Clark Expedition (1803–1806), Meriwether Lewis and the other members of the Corps of Discovery consumed dog meat, either from their own animals or supplied by Native American tribes, including the Paiutes and Wah-clel-lah Indians, a branch of the Watlatas, the Clatsop, the Teton Sioux (Lakota), the Nez Perce Indians (who did not eat dog themselves), and the Hidatsas. Lewis and the members of the expedition ate dog meat, except William Clark, who reportedly could not bring himself to eat dogs.

==== Polar exploration ====
British explorer Ernest Shackleton and his Imperial Trans-Antarctic Expedition became trapped, and ultimately killed their sled dogs for food.

Norwegian explorer Roald Amundsen's party famously planned to eat their sled dogs, as well as to feed weaker dogs to other dogs, during their expedition to the South Pole. This allowed the party to carry less food, thus lightening the load, and ultimately helped Amundsen to win his race to the South Pole against Robert Scott's expedition, which used ponies. When comparing sled dogs to ponies as draught animals, Amundsen noted:

There is the obvious advantage that dog can be fed on dog. One can reduce one's pack little by little, slaughtering the feebler ones and feeding the chosen with them. In this way they get fresh meat. Our dogs lived on dog's flesh and pemmican the whole way, and this enabled them to do splendid work. And if we ourselves wanted a piece of fresh meat we could cut off a delicate little fillet; it tasted to us as good as the best beef. The dogs do not object at all; as long as they get their share they do not mind what part of their comrade's carcass it comes from. All that was left after one of these canine meals was the teeth of the victim – and if it had been a really hard day, these also disappeared.

Douglas Mawson and Xavier Mertz were part of the Far Eastern Party, a three-man sledging team with Lieutenant B. E. S. Ninnis, to survey King George V Land, Antarctica. On 14 December 1912 Ninnis fell through a snow-covered crevasse along with most of the party's rations, and was never seen again. Mawson and Mertz turned back immediately. They had one and a half weeks' food for themselves and nothing at all for the dogs. Their meagre provisions forced them to eat their remaining sled dogs on their 315-mile (507 km) return journey. Their meat was tough, stringy and without a vestige of fat. Each animal yielded very little, and the major part was fed to the surviving dogs, which ate the meat, skin and bones until nothing remained. The men also ate the dog's brains and livers. However, eating the liver of sled dogs produces the condition hypervitaminosis A because canines have a much higher tolerance for vitamin A than humans do. Mertz suffered a quick deterioration. He developed stomach pains and became incapacitated and incoherent. On 7 January 1913, Mertz died. Mawson continued alone, eventually making it back to camp alive.

== Current laws ==
The slaughter, sale, purchase (including import), or consumption of dog meat is banned in some countries and legal in others, as listed in the table below.

Laws about dog meat intended for human consumption
Country / Territory	Slaughter and sale	Consumption	Purchase and import
Argentina		✗ Consumption illegal	
Australia	✗ Slaughter and sale illegal	✓ Consumption legal except South Australia since 1953	
Austria	✗ Slaughter illegal		
Brazil	✗ Slaughter and sale are illegal with harsher laws in specific states	✓ Consumption legal	
Canada	✓ Slaughter and sale legal	✓ Consumption legal	
Chile	✗ Commercial sale illegal	✓ Consumption legal	
Macau	✗ Commercial sale illegal	✗ Consumption illegal	
Colombia		✗ Consumption illegal	
China	✓ Slaughter legal.	✓ Consumption legal, except Shenzhen and Zhuhai since 2020	
France	✗ Slaughter and sale illegal	✓ Consumption legal	
Germany	✗ Production and sale illegal since 1986	✓ Consumption legal	✗ Import illegal
India	✓ Sale legal	✓ Consumption legal	✗ Import illegal unless with special certificate issued by Animal Quarantine and Certification Services (AQCS): This department is under the Department of Animal Husbandry.
Hong Kong	✗ All slaughter and sale is unlawful since 1950	✗ Consumption illegal since 1950	✓ Import requires a permit
Kazakhstan		✓ Consumption legal, ban announced in October 2021	
Mali	✗ Slaughter illegal since 2012		
Mexico		✗ Consumption illegal	
North Korea	✓ Slaughter and sale legal	✓ Consumption legal	
Philippines	✗ Slaughter illegal since 1998. Indigenous religious rituals are exempt. Sale, transfer, or distribution for human consumption illegal since 2007.		
Russia		✓ Consumption legal	
Rwanda	✓ Sale legal		✓ Purchase legal
South Korea	✗ Slaughter and sale illegal from 2027 after a three-year grace period	✗ Consumption illegal from 2027 after a three-year grace period	
Switzerland	✗ Commercial slaughter illegal. ✓ Slaughter for own use legal	✓ Consumption legal	✗ Import illegal
Taiwan	✗ Slaughter and sale illegal since 1998	✗ Consumption illegal since 2017	
United Kingdom	✗ Sale illegal	✓ Consumption legal	
United States	✗ Slaughter and sale have been illegal since 2018. Native Americans performing religious ceremonies are exempt. Before 2018, it was banned in six states.		✗ Import illegal

== Modern practices ==
=== Africa ===
==== Cameroon ====
Dogs are eaten by Vame people for certain religious rituals.

==== Democratic Republic of the Congo ====
In 2011, it was reported that, due to high prices on other types of meat, the consumption of dog meat is common despite a longstanding taboo.

==== Ghana ====
The Tallensi, the Akyims, the Kokis, and the Yaakuma, one of many cultures of Ghana, consider dog meat a delicacy. The Mamprusi people generally avoid dog meat, and it is eaten in a "courtship stew" provided by a king to his royal lineage. Two Tribes in Ghana, Frafra and Dagaaba are particularly known to be "tribal playmates" and consumption of dog meat is the common bond between the two tribes. Every year around September, games are organised between these two tribes and the Dog Head is the trophy at stake for the winning tribe.

It was reported in 2017 that increasing demand for dog meat (due to the belief it gives more energy) has led politician Anthony Karbo to propose dog meat factories in three northern regions of Ghana.

==== Nigeria ====
Dogs are eaten by various groups in some states of Nigeria, including Ondo State, Akwa Ibom, Cross River, Plateau, Kalaba, Taraba and Gombe of Nigeria. They are believed to have medicinal powers. The meat is believed to improve one's sex life, provide immunity from diseases and poisoning, and offer protection from juju (charms).

In late 2014, the fear of contracting the Ebola virus disease from bushmeat led at least one major Nigerian newspaper to imply that eating dog meat was a healthy alternative. That paper documented a thriving trade in dog meat and slow sales of even well smoked bushmeat.

=== Americas ===
==== Canada ====
It is legal to eat dog meat in Canada. According to a writer for the National Post, this is because it is not necessary to prevent people from eating dogs. While it is technically legal to serve dog meat in a restaurant in Canada if it has been inspected, it may not be possible to actually do so. In 2003, uninspected frozen canine meat was found at a Chinese restaurant named "Panda Garden" in Edmonton, Alberta. Provincial authorities determine if an animal species can be approved for slaughter; which would require dogs to be classified as a "food animal" and for individual animals to not be raised as pets. No license has ever been granted for this purpose. There is also no recognized way to import dog meat into the country.

==== United States ====
In December 2018, Donald Trump signed the Dog and Cat Meat Trade Prohibition Act of 2018 into law. Previously, the dog and cat meat trade was legal in 44 states.

In July 2023, congresspeople Vern Buchanan and Jared Moskowitz introduced a resolution that would call for banning dog and cat meat globally.

=== Asia/Pacific ===
==== Cambodia ====
Dog meat consumption is not practiced by most Cambodians. A new campaign began in 2020 to end dog meat consumption.

==== Hong Kong ====
In Hong Kong, the Dogs and Cats Ordinance was introduced by the British Hong Kong Government on 6 January 1950. It prohibits the slaughter of any dog or cat for use as food by fine and imprisonment. In February 1998, a Hong Konger was sentenced to one month imprisonment and a fine of two thousand HK dollars for hunting street dogs for food. Four local men were sentenced to 30 days imprisonment in December 2006 for having slaughtered two dogs.

==== India ====
Consumption of dog meat is seen in Northeast India, especially in the states of Mizoram, Nagaland, and Manipur, as well as in parts of Meghalaya.

In 2016, animal rights activist Maneka Gandhi, then Minister of Women and Child Development of India, raised a nation-wide petition to stop dog meat sale and consumption, specifically targeting Nagaland and Mizoram. The issue caught public attention when she posted on Twitter on 30 June 2022 a photograph of dog trade in Nagaland, commenting: "This is illegal according to the laws of India and it cannot be allowed under the guise of culture." In Nagaland, pet lovers had launched a campaign to end Nagaland's dog meat trade. Following Gandhi's remarks, the Federation of Indian Animal Protection Organisations (FIAPO) formally requested the Government of Nagaland to ban the consumption and trading of dog meat. On 3 July 2020, the Nagaland cabinet meeting passed the legislation for banning the sale and consumption of dog meat in the state. The regulation was enacted the next day when the Chief Secretary of Nagaland, Temjen Toy, issued an order banning dog markets, the commercial import and trading of dogs, and commercial sale of dog meat.

In November 2020, dog meat traders challenged the Nagaland's legislation at the Nagaland High Court under the case file Neizevolie Kuotsu Alias Toni Kuotsu and ors v. State of Nagaland and ors. The legislation was momentarily withheld but without final decision. In 2023, the case was put up at the Gauhati High Court Kohima Bench, in which Justice Marli Vankung made a verdict on 2 June nullifying the government's legislation. The judgement reads: "The prohibition of sale and consumption of dog meat, by the Executive branch of the Government, without there being any law passed by the legislature in relation to trade and consumption of dog meat is liable thus to be set aside, even though it was passed in accordance with a Cabinet decision." The judgement further stated that the Chief Secretary is not an authority to make such legal matters, and that selling and eating dog meat does not violate any law in India, and the practice is "an accepted norm and food among people of Nagaland."

In Mizoram, dog meat is freely sold and eaten. According to the Mizoram Animal Slaughter Act 2013, dogs are classified alongside cattle as animals allowed for slaughter, meat trade and consumption. The State Animal Welfare Board of the Government of Mizoram had challenged this classification. On 4 March 2020, the Mizoram State Assembly passed the Mizoram Animal Slaughter (Amendment) Bill, 2020, which removed dogs from animals permitted to be killed for meat. The news was taken as prohibition of slaughter of dogs in the state, but is not the case as it merely implied lack of legislation on dog meat. In 2023, there were pressures from pet lovers to enforce the Prevention of Cruelty to Animals (Dog Breeding and Marketing) Rule 2017 that would ban dog meat sale, but were received with stern criticisms from the public.

In Meghalaya, killing of stray or domesticated dogs is a punishable offence since 9 September 2021, when the Animal Husbandry & Veterinary Department of the Government of Meghalaya issued an order that prohibited slaughter of dogs for any purpose.

==== Indonesia ====
Indonesia is predominantly Muslim, a faith which considers dog meat, along with pork, to be haram (ritually unclean). The New York Times has reported that in spite of this, dog meat consumption has been growing in popularity among Muslims and other ethnic groups in the country due to its cheap price and purported health or medicinal benefits. However, dog meat consumption is rare in Indonesia and is not eaten by the most people.

Although reliable data on the dog meat trade is scarce, various welfare groups estimate that at least 1 million dogs are killed every year to be eaten. On the resort island of Bali alone, between 60,000 and 70,000 dogs are slaughtered and eaten a year, in spite of lingering concerns about the spread of rabies following an outbreak of the disease there a few years ago, according to the Bali Animal Welfare Association. Marc Ching of the Animal Hope and Wellness Foundation claimed in 2017 that the treatment of dogs in Indonesia was the "most sadistic" out of anywhere they were killed for their meat. According to Rappler and The Independent, the slaughter process for dogs in Tomohon, Sulawesi resulted in some of them being blowtorched alive.

The consumption of dog meat is often associated with the Minahasa culture of North Sulawesi, Maluku culture, Toraja culture, various ethnic from East Nusa Tenggara, and the Bataks of northern Sumatra. The code for restaurants or vendors selling dog meat is "RW", an abbreviation for rintek wuuk (Minahasan euphemism means "fine hair") or "B1" abbreviation for biang (Batak language for female dog or "bitch").

Popular Indonesian dog-meat dishes are Minahasan spicy meat dish called rica-rica. Dog meat rica-rica specifically called rica-rica "RW" which stands for Rintek Wuuk in the Minahasan language, which means "fine hair" as a euphemism referring for fine hair found in roasted dog meat. It is cooked as Patong dish by Toraja people, and as Saksang "B1" (stands for Biang which means "dog" or "bitch" in Batak dialect) by Batak people of North Sumatra. On Java, there are several dishes made from dog meat, such as sengsu (tongseng asu), sate jamu (lit. "medicinal satay"), and kambing balap (lit. "racing goat"). Asu is Javanese for "dog".

Dog consumption in Indonesia gained attention during the 2012 U.S. presidential election when incumbent Barack Obama was pointed out by his opponent to have eaten dog meat served by his Indonesian stepfather Lolo Soetoro when Obama was living in the country. Obama wrote about his experience of eating dog in his book Dreams of My Father, and at the 2012 White House Correspondents' Dinner joked about eating dog.

According to Lyn White of Animals Australia, the consumption of dog meat in Bali is not a long-held tradition. She said the meat first came from a Christian ethnic group coming to Bali, where a minority of the immigrants working in the hospitality industry have fuelled the trade.

In June 2017, an investigative report discovered that tourists in Bali are unknowingly eating dog meat sold by street vendors.

==== Japan ====
Although the vast majority of Japanese do not eat dog meat, it has been reported that more than 100 outlets in the country have been selling it imported, mainly to foreign customers. In 675 AD, Emperor Tenmu decreed a prohibition on its consumption during the 4th through 9th months of the year. According to Meisan Shojiki Ōrai (名産諸色往来) published in 1760, the meat of wild dog was sold along with boar, deer, fox, wolf, bear, raccoon dog, otter, weasel and cat in some regions of Edo.

==== Mainland China ====
Most people in China do not consume dog meat and the practice is declining. Consuming dog meat is legal in mainland China except for the city of Shenzhen, and the Chinese Ministry of Agriculture has never issued quarantine procedures for slaughtering dogs.

The eating of dog meat in China dates back to around 500 BCE, and possibly even earlier. It has been suggested that wolves in southern China may have been domesticated as a source of meat. Mencius (372–289 BCE) talked about dog meat as being an edible, dietary meat. It was reported in the early 2000s that the meat was thought to have medicinal properties, and had been popular in northern China during the winter, as it was believed to raise body temperature after consumption and promote warmth. Historical records have shown how in times of food scarcities (as in wartime situations), dogs could also be eaten as an emergency food source.

In modern times, the extent of dog consumption in China varies by region. Generally, it is most prevalent in some of the southern provinces, especially in Canton, Guangxi, Yunnan, Sichuan, Hubei and Anhui, as well as a few of the northern provinces such as Henan, Shandong and Jilin. It was reportedly common in 2010 to find dog meat served in restaurants in Southern China, where dogs are reared on farms for consumption. In 2012, Chinese netizens and the Chinese police intercepted trucks transporting caged dogs to be slaughtered in localities such as Chongqing and Kunming.

Since 2009, Yulin, Guangxi, has held a festival of eating dog meat that is reportedly a celebration of the summer solstice. Many Chinese citizens and activists were and are opposed to the festival. In 2014, the municipal government published a statement distancing itself from the festival, saying it was not a cultural tradition, but rather a commercial event held by restaurants and the public. The festival in 2011 spanned 10 days, during which 15,000 dogs were consumed. Estimates of the number of dogs eaten in 2015 for the festival ranged from as high as 10,000 to lower than 1,000 amid growing pressure at home and abroad to end it. Festival organizers state that only dogs bred specifically for consumption are used, while objectors say that some of the dogs purchased for slaughter and consumption are strays or stolen pets. Some of the dogs at the festival are alleged to have been burnt or boiled alive or beaten out of the belief that increased adrenaline circulating in the dog's body adds to the flavor of the meat. Other reports, however, state that there has been little evidence of those practices since 2015.

Prior to the 2014 festival, eight dogs (and their two cages) sold for 1,150 yuan ($185) and six puppies for 1,200 yuan. Prior to the 2015 festival, a protester bought 100 dogs for 7,000 yuan ($1,100; £710). The animal rights NGO Best Volunteer Centre commented that the city had more than 100 slaughterhouses, processing between 30 and 100 dogs a day. The Yulin Centre for Animal Disease Control and Prevention states the city has only eight dog slaughterhouses selling approximately 200 dogs, and this increases to about 2,000 dogs during the Yulin festival. There have been several campaigns to stop the festival, with the first one reportedly having started among locals in China. In 2016, a petition calling for an end to the festival garnered 11 million signatures in the country. More than 3 million people have also signed petitions against it on Weibo (China's equivalent of Twitter). Prior to the 2014 festival, doctors and nurses were ordered not to eat dog meat there, and local restaurants serving dog meat were ordered to cover the word "dog" on their signs and notices. Reports in 2014 and 2016 have also suggested that the majority of Chinese on and offline disapprove of the festival.

The movement against the consumption of cat and dog meat was given added impetus by the formation of the Chinese Companion Animal Protection Network (CCAPN). Having expanded to more than 40 member societies, CCAPN began organizing protests against eating dog and cat meat in 2006, starting in Guangzhou and continuing in more than ten other cities following a positive response from the public. Before the 2008 Beijing Olympics, officials ordered dog meat to be taken off the menu at its 112 official Olympic restaurants to avoid offending visitors from various nations where the consumption of dog meat is taboo. In 2010, draft legislation was proposed to prohibit the consumption of dog meat. In 2010, the first draft proposal of it was introduced, with the rationale to protect animals from maltreatment. The legislation included a measure to jail people for up to 15 days for eating dog meat, but there were few expectations for it to be enforced.

===== Decline =====
As of the early 21st century, dog meat consumption in China is declining. In 2014, dog meat sales decreased by a third compared to 2013. It was reported that in 2015, one of the most popular restaurants in Guangzhou serving dog meat was closed after the local government tightened regulations; the restaurant had served dog meat dishes since 1963. Other restaurants that served dog and cat meat in the Yuancun and Panyu districts also stopped serving these dishes in 2015. 8.6 million Chinese in 2016 also voted online for proposed legislation to end the consumption of dog and cat meat, but the legislation was not taken forward.

In April 2020, Shenzhen became the first Chinese city to ban consumption and production of dog and cat meat. This came as part of a wider clampdown on the wildlife trade which was thought to be linked to COVID-19 outbreak. Citing examples of Hong Kong and Taiwan, the Shenzhen city government said, "Banning the consumption of dogs and cats and other pets is a common practice in developed countries ... This ban also responds to the demand and spirit of human civilization". The city of Zhuhai followed suit in the same month with a similar ban. These decisions were applauded by animal welfare groups such as Humane Society International.

In the same month, the Chinese Ministry of Agriculture said it considers dogs as "companion animals", not as livestock.

==== Malaysia ====
Dog meat is not illegal in Malaysia, but its consumption is rare. The issue of dog meat was brought to light in 2013 after the Malaysian Independent Animal Rescue group received a report alleging that a restaurant in Kampung Melayu, Subang had dogs caged and tortured before slaughtering them for their meat.

==== North Korea ====
Most North Koreans do not consume dog meat, but its sale and consumption are allowed and endorsed by the government as part of Korean culture. Known as dangogi ("sweet meat"), it is consumed as a delicacy, with tradition stating that it helps cool down body temperature during the summer. Dangogiguk ("sweet meat soup" ) was declared a "regional intangible cultural heritage" of the DPRK in 2022.

Daily NK reported that in early 2010, the North Korean government included dog meat in its list of one hundred fixed prices, setting a fixed price of 500 won per kilogram.

==== South Korea ====
Gaegogi (개고기) literally means "dog meat" in Korean. The term itself is often mistaken as the term for Korean soup made from dog meat, which is actually called bosintang (보신탕; 補身湯, Body nourishing soup) (sometimes spelled "bo-shintang").

Estimates of the number of animals consumed vary widely. The Humane Society International has estimated that 2 million or possibly more than 2.5 million dogs are reared on "dog meat farms" in South Korea (though, this number includes puppy mills for the pet industry). According to the Korea Animal Rights Advocates (KARA), approximately 780,000 to 1 million dogs are consumed per year in South Korea. However, these numbers have been critiqued as not being based on actual data and having no scientific basis.

Estimates of dog meat consumption is much lower when accounting for actual sales. In 2017 the Moran Market, which occupied 30–40% of dog meat market in the nation, reported sales of about 20,000 dogs per year. Numbers have further declined from these 2017 estimates and all the major markets have shutdown, including Moran Market. According to the Ministry of Agriculture, Food and Rural Affairs, approximately 200 dog farms have been reported to be operating; though, the supply to the dog meat market is unclear as these farms also supply the pet industry.

In 2022, the Ministry for Food, Agriculture, Forestry and Fisheries of South Korea published a first official report called "Edible dog breeding and distribution survey". According to the report, as of February 2022, 521,121 dogs are reared in 1,156 dog meat farms and 388,000 dogs are consumed in 1,666 restaurants per year.

Over the past 50 years, dog meat consumption has been declining as more people have been adopting dogs as pets. In a 2020 survey, 84% of the Korean population reported never having consumed dog meat nor having plans to ever do so.

The most popular dish is the soup "boshingtang", a spicy stew meant to balance the body's heat during the summer months. Eating hot soups during the summer is thought to ensure good health by balancing one's "qi", the believed vital energy of the body. Dog meat is believed by some to increase the body temperature, to induce sweating to keep one cool during the summer (the way of dealing with heat is called heal heat with heat (이열치열, 以熱治熱, i-yeol-chi-yeol)). A 19th-century version of gaejang-guk explains the preparation of the dish by boiling dog meat with vegetables such as green onions and chili pepper powder. Variations of the dish contain chicken and bamboo shoots.

The sale of dog meat is illegal, but slaughter and consumption is legal. However, 'brutal' slaughters of any animals is prohibited by the Animal Protection Law (동물보호법), and some people were fined for slaughter of dogs by this law. The sale is disallowed because South Korean Food Sanitary Law (식품위생법) does not include dog meat as a legal food ingredient. The Ministry of Food and Drug Safety recognizes any edible product other than drugs as food. In the capital city of Seoul, the sale of dog meat was outlawed by regulation on 21 February 1984, by classifying dog meat as "repugnant food" (혐오식품, 嫌惡食品, hyeom-o sigpum), but the regulation was not rigorously enforced except during the 1988 Seoul Olympics. In 2001, the Mayor of Seoul announced there would be no extra enforcement efforts to control the sale of dog meat during the 2002 FIFA World Cup, which was partially hosted in Seoul. On 21 November 2018, the South Korean government closed the Taepyeong-dong complex in Seongnam, which served as the country's main dog slaughterhouse.

The primary dog breed raised for meat is a non-specific landrace, whose dogs are commonly named as Nureongi (누렁이) or Hwangu (황구). Nureongi are not the only type of dog currently slaughtered for their meat in South Korea. In 2015, The Korea Observer reported that many different pet breeds of dog are eaten in South Korea, including Labrador Retrievers, Golden Retrievers and Cocker Spaniels, and that the dogs slaughtered for their meat often include former pets. Some of them have reportedly been stolen from family homes.

There is some vocal group of Koreans (consisting of a number of animal welfare groups) who oppose the practice of eating dog meat. Some Koreans do not eat the meat, but feel that it is the right of others to do so. A group of activists attempted to promote and publicize the consumption of dog meat worldwide during the run-up to the 2002 FIFA World Cup, co-hosted by Japan and South Korea, which prompted retaliation from animal rights campaigners and prominent figures such as Brigitte Bardot to denounce the practice. Opponents of dog meat consumption in South Korea are critical of the eating of dog meat, as some dogs are beaten, burnt or hanged to make their meat more tender. In more recent decades, such practices are being prosecuted by law.

Amidst the decline in dog meat consumption in contemporary Korea, a vocal group in Korea has critiqued the international outcry toward dog meat consumption as being hypocritical. International animal rights activists have noted the hypocrisy, as well, given the horrific conditions under which factory farmed animals are raised in the West. Some Korean citizens, as well as members of the international community, have pointed out that the nations from which most of the outcry has emerged have the highest per capita meat consumption on the planet, several-fold higher than that of South Korea.

On 9 January 2024, the South Korean National Assembly passed a bill banning the breeding and slaughter of dogs for consumption, which will be starting in 2027 after a three-year grace period.

==== Philippines ====
The killing of dogs as livestock has been banned in the Philippines since 1998 via Republic Act No. 8485, known as the Animal Welfare Act of 1998, with exemptions for dogs killed and eaten as part of indigenous rituals. This was strengthened further by Republic Act No. 10631 in 2013, which amended the 1998 law by criminalizing the abuse, maltreatment, cruelty, exploitation, abandonment, and killing of pet animals; while also mandating the creation of animal welfare enforcement officers in law enforcement agencies like the Philippine National Police and the National Bureau of Investigation. Republic Act No. 9842, known as the Anti-Rabies Act of 2007, also includes specific provisions for the punishment of anyone found guilty of trading in dog meat, with a punishment of 1 to 4 years in prison and fines. Local laws banning the dog meat trade have also existed prior to the 1998 national ban. The illegal consumption of dog meat still continues in some regions in the Philippines, notably in the Cordillera highlands in northern Luzon where it is traditional. Despite the traditional practice, the consumption of dog meat can transmit a fatal viral disease called rabies, where it claimed the lives of individuals reportedly consuming it, including an individual in Davao del Norte. Nevertheless, the introduction and strengthening of laws against dog meat trade, changing public attitudes, and strict enforcement has significantly decreased the number of the dogs slaughtered for meat. As of 2020, less than 1% of the population of the Philippines have eaten dog meat.

Dog meat consumption was formerly widespread, particularly in the northern Philippines where dog meat stew, in general, acquired the euphemistic name "azucena" (or "asocena") in the 1980s. It originates from a play-on-words on the Spanish term azucena, "lily", and its resemblance to a portmanteau "asocena", from aso ("dog") + cena, ("dinner"/"meal"). They were commonly eaten as pulutan (appetizers eaten with alcohol) by men, mainly due to the superstition that dog meat "warms the body" and functions as an aphrodisiac. At the height of the dog meat trade prior to the 1990s, an estimated 500,000 dogs were killed every year.

In 1981, the diplomatic relations between the Philippines and the United Kingdom were strained when the Sunday Mirror newspaper of London published front-page photos of dogs tied up for slaughter in the Philippines. This invoked Margaret Thatcher and the British parliament to express their disapproval, which was informally conveyed to the Philippine Foreign Ministry via the British Embassy. Though initially considered an internal affair, their communications became public, eliciting a response from Assemblyman Eddie Ilarde of the National Capital Region, taking affront at suggestion that all Filipinos are cruel to dogs and eat dog meat. He clarified that while the dog meat trade does still happen, it is uncommon and prohibited by local laws in most parts of the country, including Manila. The issue sparked national interest on the dog meat trade and the inadequacy of the then existing laws against animal cruelty passed during the American colonial period of the Philippines. Then president Ferdinand Marcos ordered a study on the necessity of issuing a presidential decree prohibiting the sale and slaughter of household pets for commercial culinary purposes in 1982. In the capital city of Manila, Metro Manila Commission Ordinance 82-05 specifically prohibits the killing and selling of dogs for food.

In 1998, the Animal Welfare Act was passed, which prohibits the killing of any animal other than cattle, pigs, goats, sheep, poultry, rabbits, carabaos, horses, deer, and crocodiles – with exemptions for religious, cultural, research, public safety, and/or animal health reasons. It also specifically bans dog fighting and horse fighting.

The consumption of dog meat still continues in some areas illegally, especially in the Cordillera highlands of Luzon where indigenous tribes have legal exemptions for the consumption of dog meat during customary rituals. This loophole has been taken advantage of by some restaurants which still sell dog meat outside of the customary ritual exemption.

According to the Animal Welfare Institute, the illegal dog meat trade largely captures stray dogs from elsewhere in the country, with many of them having been people's pets. They are rounded up off the street for the dog meat trade and shipped to the Benguet province without food or water while steel cans are forced onto their noses and their legs are tied behind their backs. Nearly half the dogs reportedly die before reaching their final destination. They are usually then killed via clubbing or having their throats cut, after which their fur is scorched off with a blow-torch and their bodies are dismembered. According to a 2007 book co-authored by Temple Grandin, dogs and other animals in some rural Philippine areas could risk getting beaten before slaughter, out of the belief it would create better meat. The province of Benguet specifically allows cultural use of dog meat by indigenous people and acknowledges this might lead to limited commercial use. In Baguio and surrounding municipalities, it is regarded as an "open secret" tolerated by local law enforcement. Philippine news outlets ABS-CBN and SunStar stated in 2012 and 2017 that Korean nationals in Baguio had been playing a role in the city's dog meat trade.

In 2012, the Criminal Investigation and Detection Group (CIDG) of the Philippine National Police estimated that there were still around 290,000 dogs illegally butchered for food annually. In 2013, 250 raids were carried out on restaurants suspected of serving dog meat in the Cordilleras by the Philippine National Police and the Animal Welfare Division of the Bureau of Animal Industry, in conjunction with the NGO Animal Kingdom Foundation. Dog meat trade has decreased substantially since then.

==== Singapore ====
The sale of dog meat is banned in Singapore.

==== Taiwan ====
In 2001, the Taiwanese government imposed a ban on the sale of dog meat, due to both pressure from domestic animal welfare groups and a desire to improve international perceptions, and there were some protests. In 2007, another law was passed, significantly increasing the fines to sellers of the meat. According to The Daily Meal in 2014, dog meat remained popular in Taiwan despite the laws, especially at smaller towns and villages. Animal rights activists have accused the Taiwanese government of not prosecuting those who continue to slaughter and serve dog meat at restaurants.

In April 2017, Taiwan became the first country in East Asia to officially ban the consumption of dog and cat meat as well as jail time for those who torture and kill animals. The Animal Protection Act amendments approved by the Legislative Yuan aims to punish the sale, purchase or consumption of dog or cat meat with fines ranging from NT$50,000 to NT$2 million. The amendments also stiffen punishment for those who intentionally harm animals to a maximum two years' imprisonment and fines of NT$200,000 to NT$2 million.

In October 2017, Taiwan's national legislature, known as Legislative Yuan, passed amendments to the country's Animal Protection Act which "bans the sale and consumption of dog and cat meat and of any food products that contain the meat or other parts of these animals."

==== Timor-Leste ====
Dog meat consumption in Timor-Leste is rare and is not mainstream.

==== Thailand ====
In 2014, Thailand passed the Prevention of Animal Cruelty and Provision of Animal Welfare Act.

==== Uzbekistan ====
Dog meat has sometimes been used in Uzbekistan in the belief that it has medicinal properties.

==== Vietnam ====
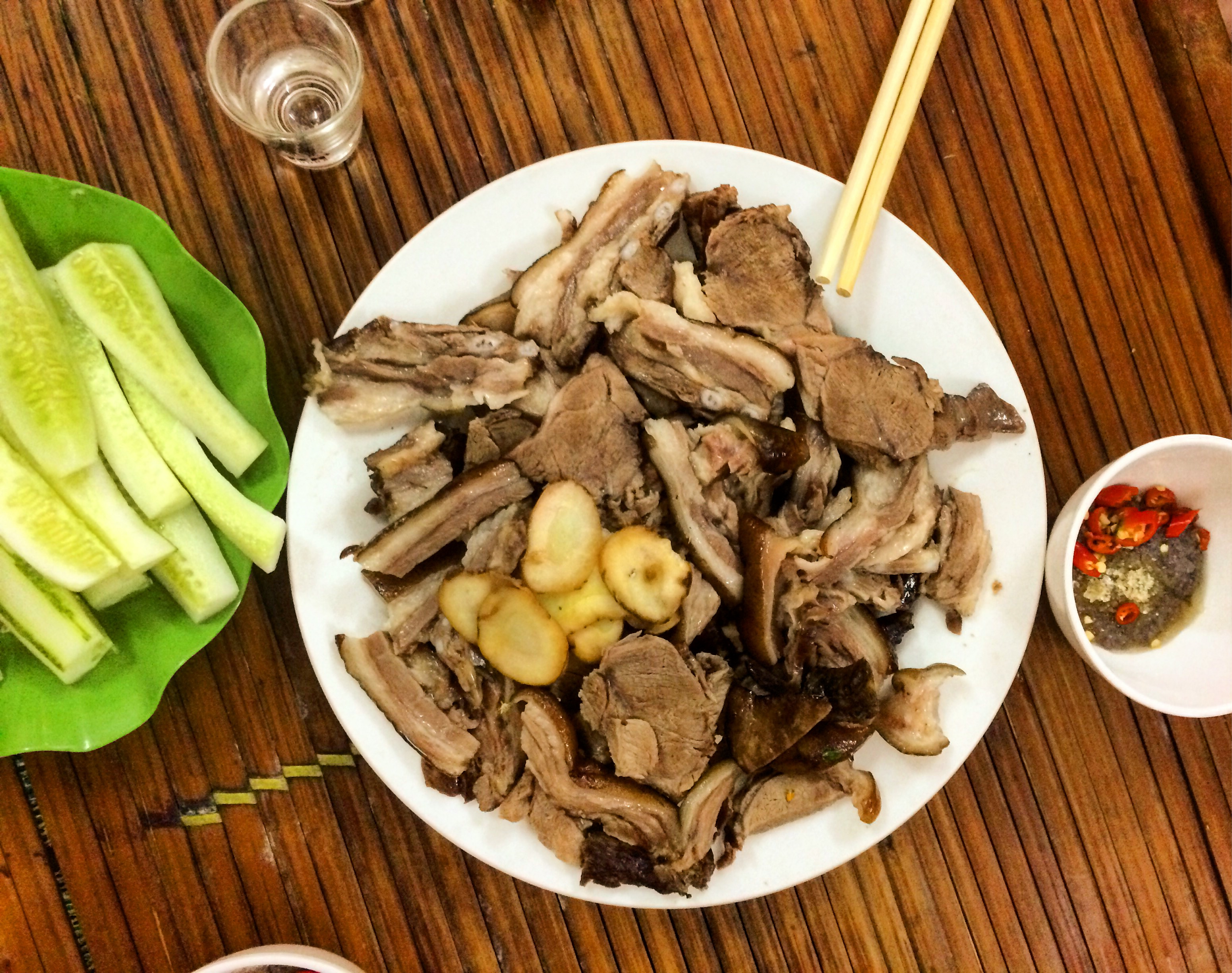
Dog meat in Hanoi, Vietnam

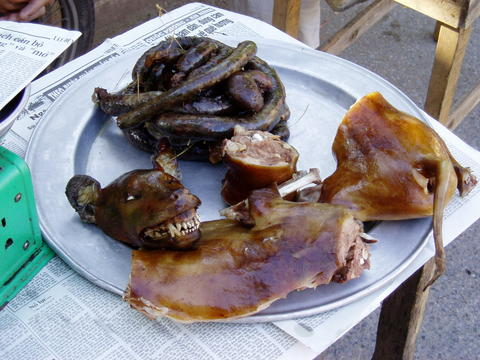
A dog meat platter found in a street market a few kilometres east of Hanoi, Vietnam

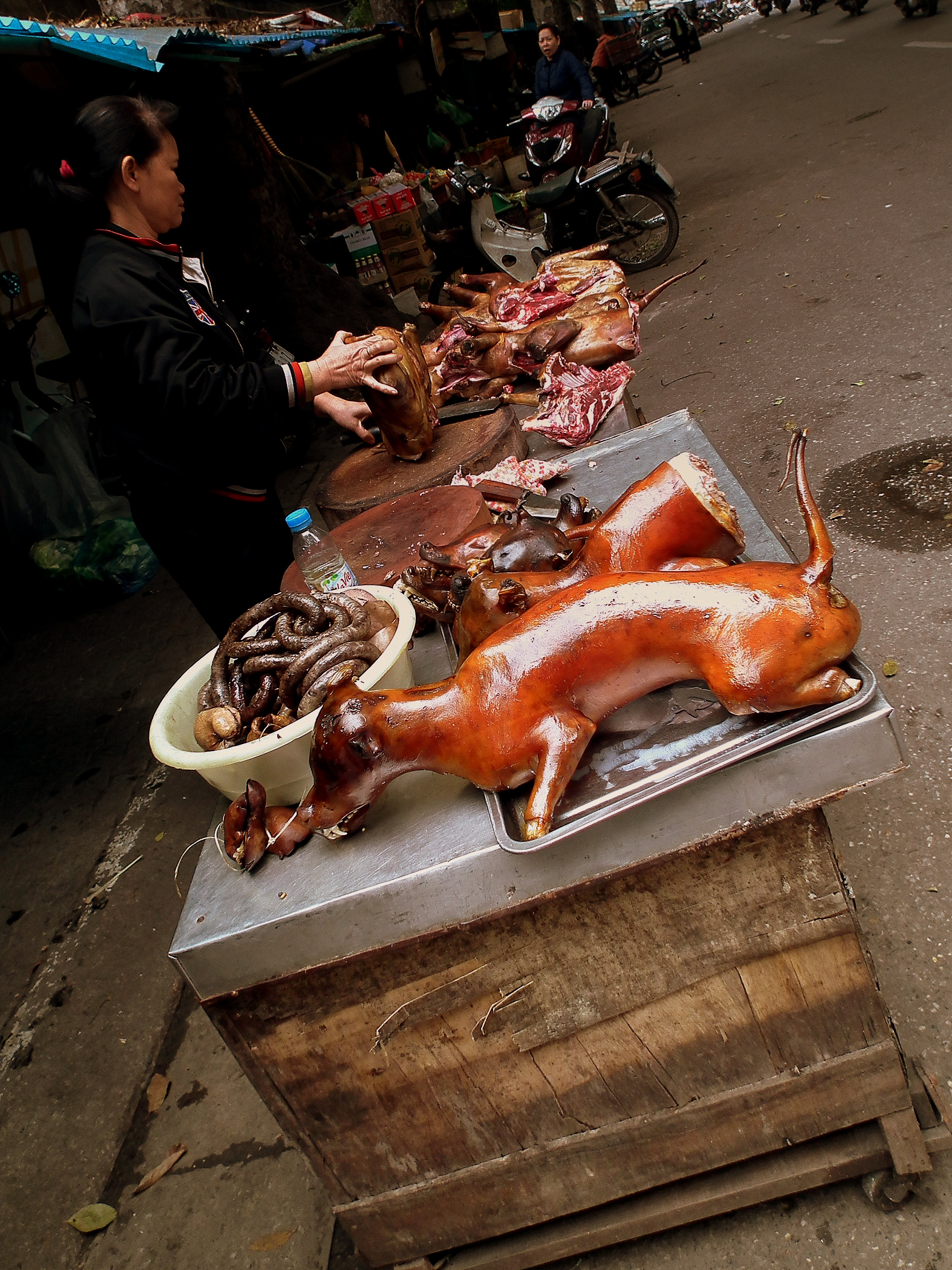
Dog meat in Hanoi, Vietnam

Today, the majority of Vietnamese do not consume dog meat and the practice is on decline. In a 2021 survey, around 91% of respondents wanted dog meat to be banned. 95% of respondents also answered that dog meat consumption is not a part of Vietnamese culture.

In urban areas, there are places that contain dog meat restaurants. Groups of customers, usually male, seated on mats, will spend their evenings sharing plates of dog meat and drinking alcohol. The consumption of dog meat can be part of a ritual usually occurring toward the end of the lunar month for reasons of astrology and luck. Restaurants which mainly exist to serve dog meat may only open for the last half of the lunar month.

There used to be a large smuggling trade from Thailand to export dogs to Vietnam for human consumption. A concerted campaign between 2007 and 2014 by animal activists in Thailand, led by the Soi Dog Foundation, convinced authorities in both Thailand and Vietnam that the dog meat trade was a hindrance to efforts to tackle rabies in Southeast Asia. In 2014, Thailand introduced a new law against animal cruelty, which greatly increased penalties faced by dog smugglers. The trade had significantly diminished.

There are indications that the desire to eat dog meat in Vietnam is declining. Part of the decline is thought to be due to an increased number of Vietnamese people keeping dogs as pets, as their incomes have risen in the past few decades.

=== Europe ===
==== Austria ====
Section 6, Paragraph 2 of the law for the protection of animals prohibits the killing of dogs and cats for purposes of consumption as food or for other products.

==== Switzerland ====
In 2012, the Swiss newspaper Tages-Anzeiger reported that dogs, as well as cats, are eaten regularly by a few farmers in rural areas. Commercial slaughter and sale of dog meat is banned, but farmers are allowed to slaughter dogs for personal consumption.

In his 1979 book Unmentionable Cuisine, Calvin Schwabe described a Swiss dog meat recipe, gedörrtes Hundefleisch, served as paper-thin slices, as well as smoked dog ham, Hundeschinken, which is prepared by salting and drying raw dog meat.

It is illegal in Switzerland to commercially produce food made from dog meat.

==== United Kingdom ====
Although the commercial trade of dog meat is illegal, it is still currently legal in the United Kingdom to consume dog meat.

==== France ====
In France, butcher shops selling dog meat were open all around the country until c. 1910.

In his poem "Alcools", Guillaume Apollinaire mentions a butcher who sells dog meat.

=== Oceania ===
==== Australia ====
Each Australian state or territory has its own regulation, but all have laws either making it illegal to eat dog meat or to kill a dog for consumption. It is also prohibited to sell dog meat based on meat processing standards and codes.

==== Tonga ====
The consumption of domestic dog meat is commonplace in Tonga, and has also been noted in expatriate Tongan communities in New Zealand, Australia, and the United States.

== Other dog products ==
=== Central Asia ===
According to Eurasianet, dog fat is seen as a well-established would-be treatment for tuberculosis in parts of Central Asia. The fat has reportedly been used as a folk remedy for COVID-19 in Uzbekistan and Kyrgyzstan.

=== Poland ===
Eating dog meat is taboo in Polish culture. However, since the 16th century, fat from various animals, including dogs, was used as part of folk medicine, and since the 18th century dog fat has had a reputation as being beneficial for the lungs. While making lard, or smalec, out of dogs' fat is currently discouraged in the country, this practice continues in some rural areas, especially Lesser Poland.

In 2009, Polish prosecutors reportedly found that a farm near Częstochowa was overfeeding dogs to be rendered down into lard. According to Grażyna Zawada, from Gazeta Wyborcza, there were farms in Częstochowa, Kłobuck, and in the Radom area, and in the decade from 2000 to 2010 six people producing dog lard were found guilty of breaching animal welfare laws and sentenced to jail. However, the Krakow Post reported that a man who had admitted to stealing and killing dogs for lard in 2009 at Wieliczka was found not guilty of any crimes by the court, who ruled that the dogs had been slaughtered humanely for culinary purposes. As of 2014, there have been new cases prosecuted.

=== South Korea ===
Gaesoju (개소주; 개燒酒) also known as dog wine, is a mixed drink containing dog meat and other Chinese medicine ingredients such as ginger, chestnut, and jujube to act primarily as a powerful sex drive booster for men, though it is also used to get rid of colds.

It is produced by putting a slaughtered dog into a chicken plucker to remove the fur before being placed into a pressure cooker for 6–19 hours with herbs until it is a dark liquid and bottled as a drink. Women in South Korea produce homemade gaesoju for their husbands as a bedroom gift, or they purchase commercial gaesoju from special markets.

In terms of popularity, there is a South Korean song which mentions a wife turning a dog into gaesoju for her husband and popularity of Gaesoju as a sex tonic is rising compared to dog meat sales.

== Dog breeds used for meat ==
The Nureongi in Korea is most often used as a livestock dog, raised for its meat, and not commonly kept as pets.

The Tosa, or Japanese Fighting Dog is replacing older breeds or mutts in South Korea. The Tosa is not commonly a pet and is banned in multiple countries; it is also very lean with a little bit of fat, making it ideal for meat production. Currently only government-approved dog farms in Korea raise Tosa for meat.

Tang Dogs are prized as a companion and watch dog but are also occasionally used for hunting and as meat dogs.

The Chow Chow was also known as "Chinese Edible-Dog" because after the Han dynasty collapsed, they were fattened and bred with Chinese breeds for meat. Today, Chinese dog farms still raise Chow Chow for the purpose of eating; black coated ones are valued due to their taste when fried, while the rest are typically turned into stews.

The Xoloitzcuintli, or Mexican hairless dog, is one of several breeds of hairless dog and has been used as a historical source of food for the Aztec Empire.

The extinct Hawaiian Poi Dog and Polynesian Dog were breeds of pariah dog used by Native Hawaiians as a spiritual protector of children and as a source of food.

The extinct Tahitian Dog was a food source, and served by high ranking chiefs to the early European explorers who visited the islands. Captain James Cook and his crew developed a taste for the dog, with Cook noting, "For tame Animals they have Hogs, Fowls, and Dogs, the latter of which we learned to Eat from them, and few were there of us but what allow'd that a South Sea dog was next to an English Lamb."

== See also ==
- Bambi effect
- Carnism
- Cat meat
- Cow meat
- Dog meat consumption in Nigeria
- Pig meat
- Speciesism
- Seal meat
- Taboo food and drink
- Wolf meat
