= Unmentionable Cuisine =

- First edition cover
- Author: Calvin Schwabe
- Language: English
- Subject: Food habits; ethnic food
- Published: 1979
- Publisher: University Press of Virginia
- Publication place: United States
- Media type: Print
- Pages: 476
- ISBN: 978-0813911625
- Dewey Decimal: 641.6
- LC Class: TX371 .S38

Unmentionable Cuisine is a 1979 nonfiction book written by Calvin Schwabe, a professor of epidemiology in the veterinary medicine school at the University of California, Davis, and a consultant for the World Health Organization's several projects. Essentially a discourse urging American readers to overcome their alleged prejudice and eat the meats consumed in other cultures, the book contains hundreds of recipes he had collected over the years for ingredients not normally considered as human food in the United States, such as earthworm, dog meat, and cat meat.

Schwabe argues in this work that Americans will need to be less discriminating about food in order to mitigate food shortage, citing an estimated number of dogs and cats born in the United States every hour and calling the surplus among them "potentially edible meat being wasted".

== Reception ==
American anthropologist Frederick J. Simoons noted Schwabe's genuine concerns with the global food crisis, calling Unmentionable Cuisine an attempt to communicate an appreciation for what Schwabe regarded as wasted or underutilized animal products.
