= Street dogs in Thailand =

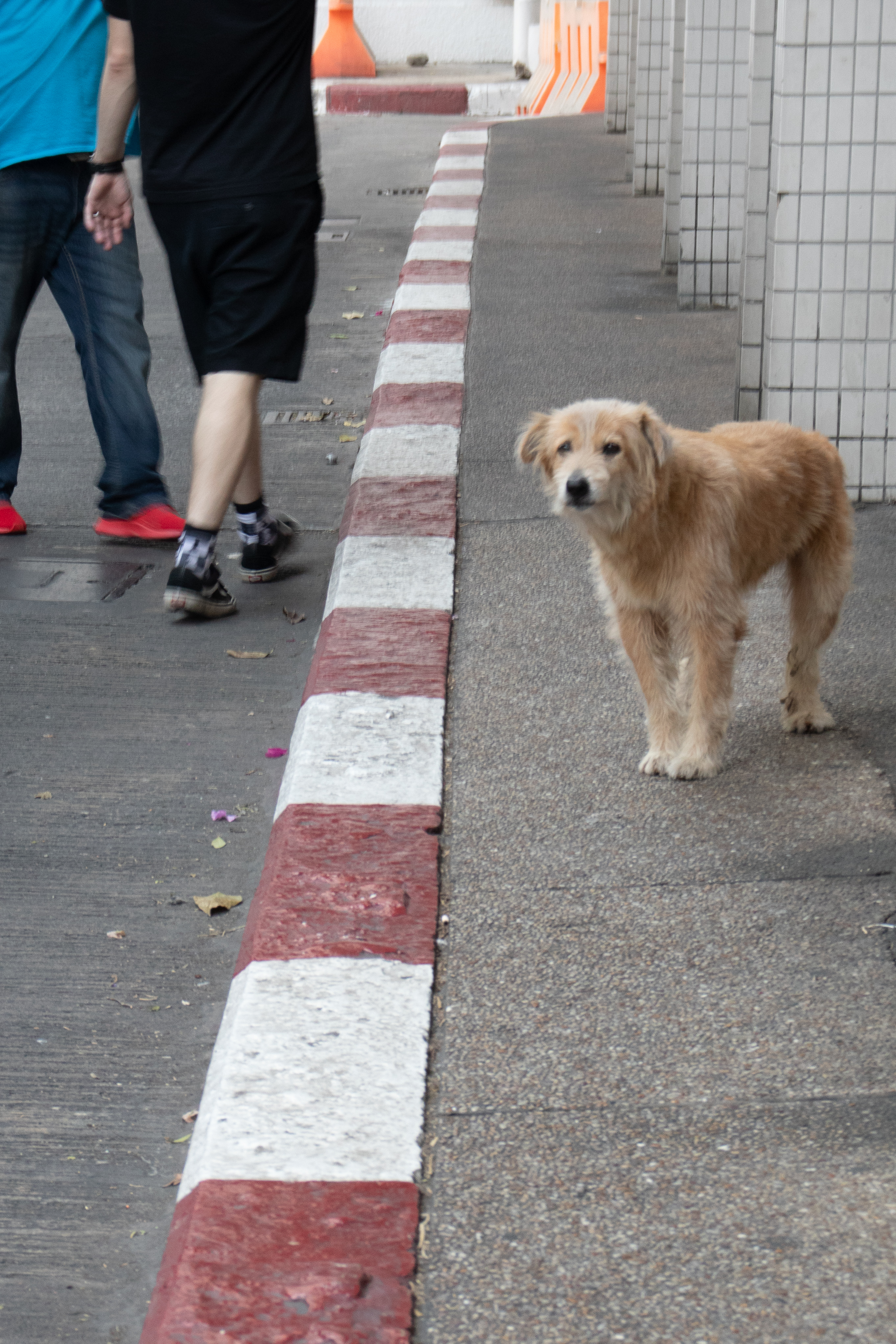
A street dog in front of the Shangri-La Hotel in Bangkok

Street dogs, commonly soi dogs (in Thai soi means 'side-street', 'lane', or 'alley') in Thailand, are ownerless, free-ranging dogs. These dogs are sometimes rounded up and sold as meat in Vietnam and China. It is estimated that there are about 8.5 million dogs in Thailand, of which about 730,000 are abandoned by their owners. Bangkok alone is estimated to have from 100,000 to 300,000 street dogs. Few have been vaccinated against canine diseases.

== Management ==
In the 1990s, more than 200 dogs were euthanized each day. In 2000, however, the Animal Guardians Association campaigned against the practice, which they argued violated Buddhist principles. They launched a sterilization program in Bangkok. The campaign generated substantial public outcry against the euthanasia, and the city adopted a pro-life dog policy.

A regulation has forbidden the feeding of stray dogs in public places.

In September 2005, the Bangkok Metropolitan Administration began a program of mandatory registration for dogs. The program was aimed to deter the abandonment of dogs, which could be traced to their owners. Requirements for registration include the implantation of a microchip identifying the owner, rabies vaccination status for dogs less than one year old, and sterilization.

Starting on 4 July 2008, dogs found unregistered may be sent to a dog kennel in the northern province of Uthai Thani and their owners can be fined up to 5,000 baht. Critics of mandatory registration have asserted that it has actually increased the number of strays, as dog owners who do not wish to pay for implementation are abandoning their pets rather than risking fines.

Before prominent events, stray dogs have been rounded up and sent to shelters. This occurred before the 2003 Asia-Pacific Economic Cooperation Summit meeting, when thousands of dogs were removed from Bangkok and sent to the Livestock Development Department's animal quarantine stations in Phetchaburi and Sa Kaeo Provinces. Stray dogs were again transported from the city in preparation for the king's 2006 anniversary celebration, with efforts focusing on areas near expensive hotels where royal guests stayed. These strays were sent to the kennel in Uthai Thani, where it was planned they would stay until their death.

The Thai cabinet, in October 2018, approved an amendment to the Cruelty Prevention and Welfare of Animal Act, B.E. 2557 (2014). The amendment, initiated by the Department of Livestock Development of the Agriculture Ministry, would require the registration of pets nationwide. The majority of pet owners have accepted the need for registration in principle, but object to the proposed registration fee of 450 baht per animal. Thailand had about 350,000 stray dogs and cats in 2007. By 2017 the number had risen to 860,000. According to the Department of Livestock Development, "If we do nothing, Thailand will have as many as 2 million stray dogs and cats in 2027 and 5 million in 2037."

== In popular culture ==
The 2006 Thai film Kao Niew Moo Ping by Siwaporn Pongsuwan focused on the relationship between a runaway girl and the stray dog she befriends.

In 2007 the film Ma-Mha 4 Ka Krub, also Mid-Road Gang, debuted. It is about a pack of stray dogs in suburban Bangkok who want to cross a busy highway in hopes of finding a better life on the other side of the road. It is the first Thai live-action feature film to portray animal characters in leading roles.

== See also ==
- Soi Dog Foundation
- Animal welfare in Thailand
