= Tang Dog =

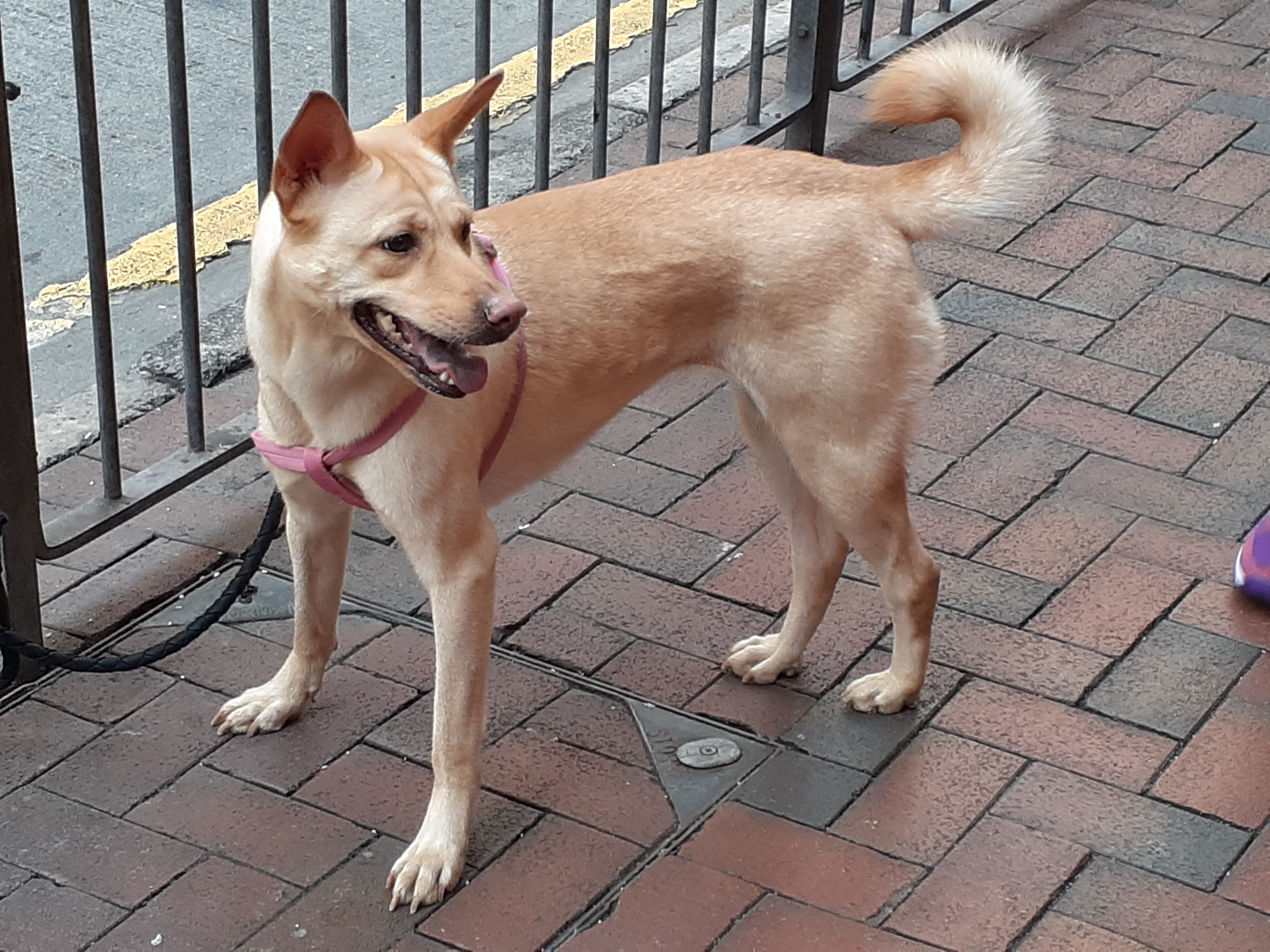
- Origin: China

The Tang Dog (唐狗) is an ancient medium-sized dog breed indigenous to southern China or in Cantonese Tong Gau refers to a Hong Kong village dog. Tang dogs are prized as a companion and watch dog but are also occasionally used for hunting and as meat dogs. The breed is named for the Tang Dynasty, a period of prosperity in China.

== Appearance ==
The Tang dog has a rich coat, compact body and short stature. It is a medium-sized dog with a ratio of shoulder height to body length of 10:10. The face has a bluish-black tongue, a large, broad nose, and long, slightly sloping eyes. Tang dogs are always solid colors, which may include cream, red or black.

== History ==
Tang dogs are native to southern China and have been used for thousands of years in southern China as loyal gatekeepers.

In the 2000s, the Tang Dog Association was established in Hong Kong to raise people's attention to Tang dogs. In 2017, a Tang Dog won the World Dog Show championship at the dog show held by the Chinese Kennel Union.
