= Dog and Cat Meat Trade Prohibition Act of 2018 =

Federal law banning the dog and cat meat trade in the United States

- Long title: An Act to prohibit the slaughter of dogs and cats for human consumption, and for other purposes.
- Nicknames: Dog and Cat Meat Trade Prohibition Act of 2018
- Enacted by: the 115th United States Congress
- Effective: December 20, 2018

Citations
- Public law: Pub. L. 115–334 (text) (PDF)

Codification
- Titles amended: 7 U.S.C.: Agriculture
- U.S.C. sections created: 7 U.S.C. ch. 54 § 2160

Legislative history
- Introduced in the House by Vern Buchanan (R–FL) and Alcee Hastings (D-FL); Passed the House on September 12, 2018 (voice vote) Died in the Senate and incorporated into the 2018 United States farm bill.

The Dog and Cat Meat Trade Prohibition Act of 2018 (H.R. 6720), was a bipartisan bill intended to outlaw the slaughter and trade of cats and dogs for meat in the United States. Although not enacted in its own right, a version of it was incorporated into the 2018 Farm Bill on December 11, 2018. The reconciled farm bill was signed into law on December 20, 2018.

The law prohibits the slaughter, shipping, transportation, sale, possession, or donation of dogs and cats (or their parts) for human consumption when conduct occurs in or affects interstate or foreign commerce. Violations are punishable by a fine of up to $5,000 per violation. An exception is provided for Native American tribes performing religious ceremonies.

The original bill was first introduced in March 2017 by Republican Representative Vern Buchanan and Democratic Representative Alcee Hastings. In November 2017, it passed the House Foreign Affairs Committee as part of an effort to encourage the end of the dog and cat meat trade in countries such as China, South Korea, Vietnam, and India. The bill passed the House by voice vote on September 12, 2018. The Senate received it on September 17 and referred it to the Committee on Agriculture, Nutrition, and Forestry.

The bill was promoted by the animal welfare group, the Animal Hope and Wellness Foundation (AHWF). They believe the practice of slaughtering dogs and cats for human consumption is still legal in 44 U.S. states, although federally prohibited.
