= Animal welfare in Thailand =

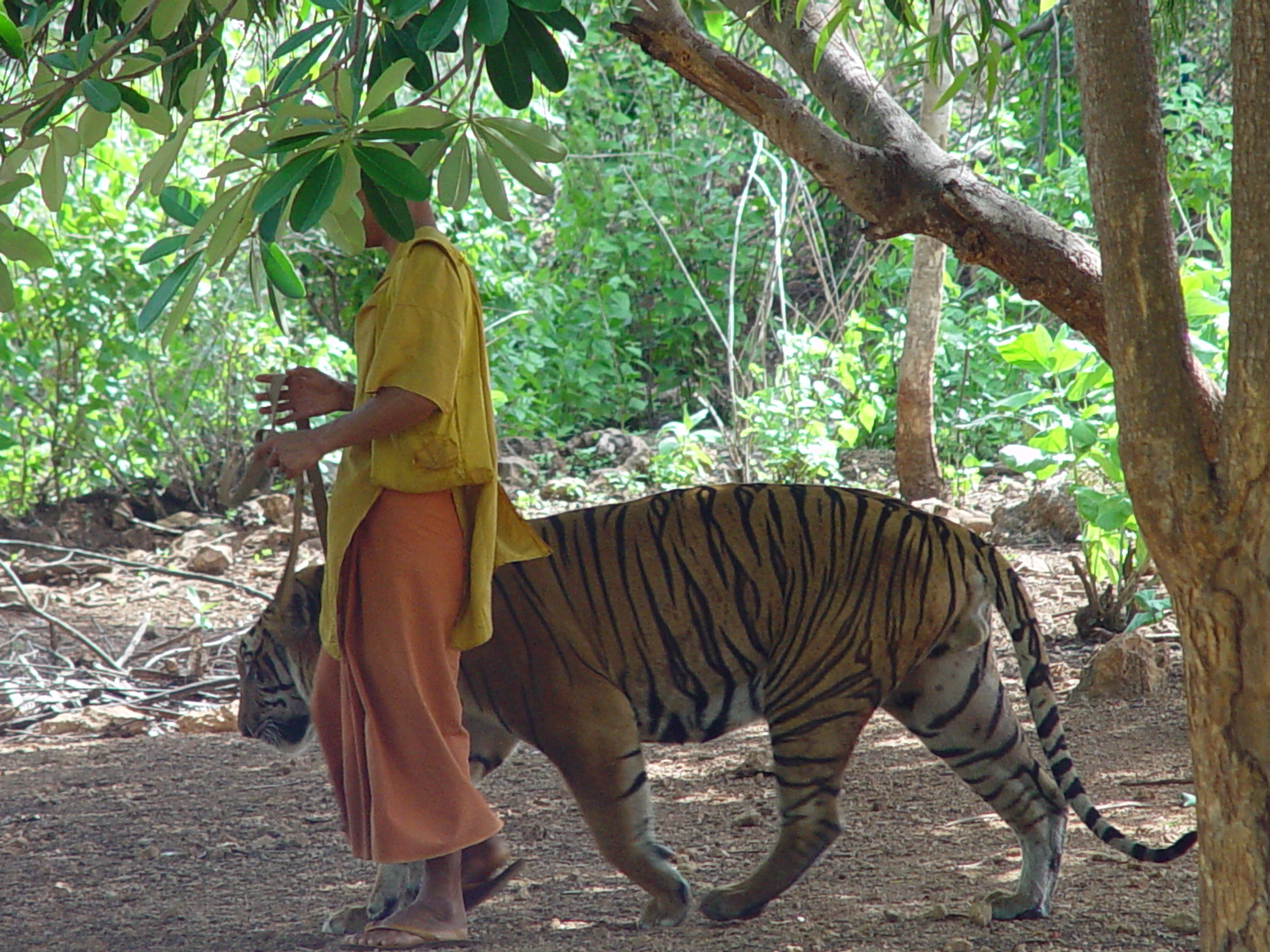
A monk walks a captive tiger at the Tiger Temple. Authorities seized protected birds from the temple in 2015. National Geographic alleged in 2016 that the Buddhist monks there are operating a for-profit breeding, selling, and exploitation business with the enslaved tigers.

Animal welfare in Thailand relates to the treatment of animals in fields such as agriculture, hunting, medical testing, tourism, and the domestic ownership of animals. It is distinct from animal conservation.

== Laws ==
Thailand introduced its first animal welfare law in 2014. The Cruelty Prevention and Welfare of Animal Act, B.E. 2557 (2014) came into being on 27 December 2014.

Animals protected by the law are defined as those "raised as pets, as animals for work, as beasts of burden, as friends, as livestock, as performing show animals, or for any other purpose, no matter with or without owners". Owners of animals are now required by law to "raise, nurture and keep the animals in appropriate conditions with good health and sanitation and with sufficient food and water". Within the act, the term "owner" is deemed to cover all family members, domestic help, and any friends assigned to take care of a pet.

Menus with live vertebrate are now illegal in Thailand. Trading in and consuming dog and cat meat is now illegal in Thailand under the 2014 Act. Feeding live prey to snakes, crocodiles or other animals is also prohibited.

It prohibits neglect, torture, and uncaring transport of live animals. Neglect includes improper housing and transportation of animals, which can lead to injury and death. An offense is punishable by law, which may impose a two year-term in prison, and a fine of up to 40,000 baht (US$1,663), or both.

Pet owners who dump unwanted dogs and cats at temples can now be charged with abandoning and endangering the animal. People are instead encouraged take injured or unwanted animals to animal welfare organisations and associations who will raise the funds required or contact the authorities to manage the problem.

The Thai cabinet, in October 2018, approved an amendment to the animal cruelty law. The amendment, initiated by the Department of Livestock Development of the Agriculture Ministry, would require the registration of pets. The majority of pet owners have accepted the need for registration in principle, but object to the proposed registration fee of 450 baht per animal.

== Animal welfare issues ==
=== Abandoned animals ===
Thailand had about 350,000 stray dogs and cats in 2007. By 2017 the number had risen to 860,000. According to the Department of Livestock Development, "If we do nothing, Thailand will have as many as 2 million stray dogs and cats in 2027 and 5 million in 2037."

=== Animal fighting ===
Killing animals according to religious ceremonies or beliefs and animal fighting according to local custom, such as cockfighting, is still permitted under the Prevention of Animal Cruelty and Provision of Animal Welfare Act.

=== Exploitation of elephants ===
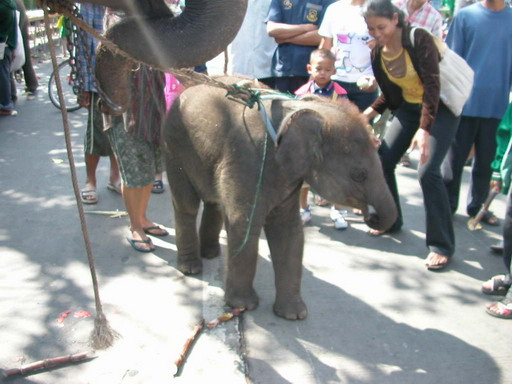
Elephants at the annual Surin Elephant Round-up.

Working and performing elephants in Thailand are often poached from Myanmar and trafficked into Thailand. There are around 6,500 elephants currently living in Thailand, with around 2,500 of them being caught from the wild. Trafficked animals can be passed off as being locally reared, with birth and ownership documentation falsified.

Baby elephants are taken from the wild, with the adult elephants around the baby killed. The elephants are then often put through a process of beatings to "mentally break" them, to make them submissive for the lucrative entertainment of tourists in tourist parks.

Animal welfare advocates have called for better legislation and systems to document the origin of elephants in tourist camps and other locations across Thailand.

In 2014, several leading responsible tourism businesses including Responsible Travel and Intrepid Travel stopped offering holiday itineraries including elephant rides. The move led to a more widespread understanding of elephant welfare issues within the wider tourism industry.

The organisations cite concerns around the training regimes needed to tame elephants – commonly known as ‘phajaan’ or the ‘crush’, - damage caused to elephants’ spines from carrying tourists in howdahs on their backs, use of bullhooks or ankus to control the elephants, lack of freedom, and psychological abuse.

In 2019, the Association of British Travel Agents, ABTA, told its members that it considers elephant riding in Thailand and other destinations to be unacceptable, and that no elephants should be punished or harmed in order to become submissive to humans.

Elephant-related tourism in Thailand affected by its recommendations include other activities such as elephant shows, elephant painting, and photo-calls.

In 2023, Responsible Travel furthered its stance on elephants in Thailand by removing any itineraries that allow bathing with elephant experiences, again citing concerns around the training needed to make the elephants docile enough to interact safely with tourists.

It recommends tourists in Thailand visit no-touch, observation-only elephant sanctuaries.

=== Exploitation of tigers in tourism ===
Tiger tourism in Thailand is more recent than elephant tourism which followed the logging prohibition in Thailand national parks in 1989. From 2001-2006, Prime Minister Thaksin Shinawatra shifted foreign animal exhibits, such as zoos or aquariums, to exotic animal interactive exhibits. These included hands-on contact with tigers.

Captive tigers are particular victims of such hands-on contact for tourist entertainment. Around 1500 tigers are currently trapped in Thailand's tourism industry.

The most common forms of tiger tourism in Thailand, observed by different animal welfare organisations over the years, are selfies with adult tigers and selfies with tiger cubs, followed by less common yet hands-on activities such as tiger feeding and circus-style tiger performances for visitors.

1. Abuse in Tiger Tourism

It is repeatedly reported that the captive tigers in venues providing direct visitor-tiger interaction in Thailand are typically separated from their mothers at a young age prematurely. The cubs used for cub feeding receive tourists from only a few weeks of age, and are forced to work all day without food, water, or rest for photo ops (selfies). Tiger mothers may also fall victim to the early removal of tiger cubs to face the risk of intense breeding. The separation causes both cubs and mothers great stress. In the wild, they would stay together until the young tigers are about two years old.

While concerns about the treatment of big cats in Thailand have been raised for year, cruelty against photo-prop (selfie) animals, tigers, lions and ligers, is still observed at all the 11 zoos across Thailand visited by an animal rights charity in 2023. Tigers were seen having lighter flames put under their noses so they would lift their heads for pictures. Other forms of abuse included chaining them tightly by the neck to concrete slabs, and hitting them repeatedly with long sticks, including in the face.

Cruel abuse is also inflicted upon tigers to perform stunts in circus-like shows. A staff member at former Sri Racha Tiger Zoo, now Tiger Topia, disclosed that the staff limited “their food when they are naughty...we can punish them by letting tigers starve”. Indeed, none of the distressing, unnatural performances in a circus-like show such as jumping through burning hoops and balancing on a tight wire would be possible without harsh training regimes to make the tigers compliant enough to perform. When on stage throughout the shows, trainers also had a sturdy whip to direct and control the behaviour of the tigers.

2. Living Conditions in Tiger Tourism Venues

Years of research conducted by different animal welfare organisations have concluded that most tigers in Thailand's tourism venues are kept in inadequate conditions. Tigers are typically kept in small concrete-floored cage or barren enclosure with little to no clean water, enrichment and veterinary treatment, suggesting a lifetime of misery for these tigers. While in the wild, some tiger subspecies such as Siberian tiger can have extremely large territories of up to 2,000km2, the cage size at Thailand's tiger facilities can be as small as 2m by 2m. In a 2015 – 2016 research conducted by World Animal Protection, 12% of the tigers observed in 17 venues providing direct visitor-tiger interaction in Thailand were found to have behavioural problems. These included stereotypical or overly aggressive behaviours such as repetitive pacing or biting their tails. These behaviours most commonly occur when animals feel they cannot cope with stressful environment or situations. Such behaviours have also never been documented in wild animals living in the wild and highlight the inadequacy of captive environment.

== See also ==
- Street dogs in Thailand
- Category:Animal welfare organizations based in Thailand
- List of species native to Thailand
