= Animal Kingdom Foundation =

Filipino animal welfare organization

- Founded: 2002
- Founder: Charles Leslie Wartenberg
- Type: Non-governmental organization
- Purpose: Animal welfare
- Location: No. 8, Purante St., Brgy. Cub-cub, Capas, Tarlac, Philippines
- Coordinates: 15°19′44″N 120°35′49″E
- Website: https://www.akfrescues.org/

Animal Kingdom Foundation or AKF, is a non-profit animal welfare non-governmental organization based in the Philippines. Founded in 2002, it is committed to "improving the living and welfare conditions of animals", eliminating the trade of dog meat for human consumption, and advocating for the improvement of animal living conditions.

== History ==
Animal Kingdom Foundation was founded in 2002 by Charles Leslie Wartenberg after learning about the dog meat trade in the Philippines. Slaughtering dogs for their meat is illegal in the Philippines. Wartenberg therefore assembled a team intended to attempt to save dogs from slaughter and hold the practitioners liable. They have conducted many raids and interceptions in various locations, saving thousands of dogs.

=== Disaster Response ===
AKF has initiated quick responses during volcanic eruptions, floods, typhoons, and other natural disasters by providing veterinary attention, feeding and rescue of the affected animals while also providing immediate shelter to the surviving dogs.

== Facilities ==
=== Clinic ===
Apart from tending to the needs of the organization's rescued dogs, AKF's low-cost clinic is also open to the public for veterinary services (e.g. veterinary consultation, hospitalization, grooming and hygiene, and vaccine & immunization).
