= Prevention of Animal Cruelty and Provision of Animal Welfare Act =

National Legislative Assembly of Thailand
- Long title: Animal Cruelty Prevention and Animal Welfare Provision Act, 2557 BE
- Territorial extent: Thailand
- Passed by: National Legislative Assembly of Thailand
- Passed: 12 November 2014
- Assented to by: King Bhumibol Adulyadej
- Royal assent: 26 December 2014
- Commenced: 27 December 2014

Keywords
- cruelty to animals · animal welfare
- Status: In force

Prevention of Cruelty and Animal Welfare Provision Act 2014 (Thai: พระราชบัญญัติป้องกันการทารุณกรรมและการจัดสวัสดิภาพสัตว์ พ.ศ. ๒๕๕๗; literally "Prevention of Cruelty and Animal Welfare Provision Act, 2557 BE") is a parliamentary act of the National Legislative Assembly of Thailand.

The bill was discussed in the 2014 winter session of the assembly, and was approved by a vote of 188 to 1. It was officially enacted on 26 December 2014 and came into force the following day. It is Thailand's first animal welfare law.

Its principal mandates are to impel animal owners to provide appropriate care and shelter, and to stop the illegal meat trade. The act also covers animals in nature, to the extent determined by the agricultural minister who is in charge of the act.

It prohibits neglect, torture, and uncaring transport, usage, as well as show of live animals. Neglect includes improper housing and transportation of animals which may lead to injury and death. An offense is punishable by law, which may impose a maximum two years-term in prison, and fine of up to 40,000 baht (US$1,663), or both.

== Background ==
Thailand is infamous for its stray animals, particularly cats and dogs. It is a centre of major illegal dog trade for meat. In addition to domestic use, dogs are exported to China and Vietnam. These animals are cramped up in bags or cages in transit sometimes resulting in death. There are also numerous reports of pet thefts. Many pet owners dump unwanted animals on the street.

Thailand had no specific legislation for acts of cruelty to animals. There is a minor criminal code under which cruelty to animals is punishable by a maximum one month in prison and a 1,000 baht fine. But the code does not clarify what cruelty is, and was never enforced. Groups such as the Thai Society for the Prevention of Cruelty to Animals, and the Soi Dog Foundation, led a global campaign resulting in pressure on the Thai government to take action. Kiatiyos Roger Lohanan (aka Roger Lohanan), founder of Thai Animal Guardians Association, lobbied against dog eating which initiated the drafting process in 1999. He continue to lobbie lawmakers

A major breakthrough came in April 2012 when the Animal Activist Alliance of Thailand (AAA), collaborating with 30 other animal protection groups protested in front of the parliament. As a result, a parliamentary sub-committee was created to prepare a draft bill to address the torture and abuse of animals. It had representatives from various animal welfare organisations.

The draft bill titled "Prevention of Cruelty and Animal Welfare Provision Bill" was discussed and voted at the November session of the National Legislative Assembly. It was passed on 12 November by a vote of 188 members for, one against, and four abstentions. The act came into effect on 27 December 2014 as "Prevention of Animal Cruelty and Provision of Animal Welfare Act 2014".

== Features ==
The main objective of the act is to ensure adequate care of animals.

The animals protected by this act are those normally raised as pets, raised for work, raised as beasts of burden, raised as friends, raised as livestock, raised for performance, or raised for any other purpose, with or without owners, and including wild animals as designated by the minister in charge of the act (agricultural minister).

The act defines cruelty to animals as "any action or inaction that causes animal to suffer physically or psychologically, induces pain, illness, disability, or death, including using of disabled, ill, aged, or pregnant animal for exploitation, for sexual activity as well as over working animal or inappropriate work in case of illness, aging or under aging."

Although there is only one article in specific to cruelty and 20 exclusions from such in the law, it does implies against various forms of abuse and dog eating.

The act permits designated officials to search vehicles, homes or businesses without a warrant in urgent situations.

Deserted and injured animals without owner are also protected and can be provided for by the designated officials.

Animal owners are compelled to follow the Five Freedoms principle of animal welfare, namely from hunger or thirst, from discomfort, from pain, injury or disease, from fear and distress, and Freedom to express normal behavior.

=== Rejected proposals ===
There were 20 specified acts of cruelty proposed by animal rights groups included in the draft bill that were not approved.

The major points omitted are intended as guidelines against cruel action often found, such as burning animals alive, placing rival animals together, animal fight, eating live animals, etc.

== Enforcement ==
The first offense of the act was reported in January 2015. Kamdee Kotata, a 50 year-old villager in northeastern Nong Khai Province, was arrested by police officers on 5 January. After a dog bit his chicken, the man threw a knife at a dog, cutting the dog's face.

== See also ==
- Animal welfare in Thailand
