= Maluku culture =

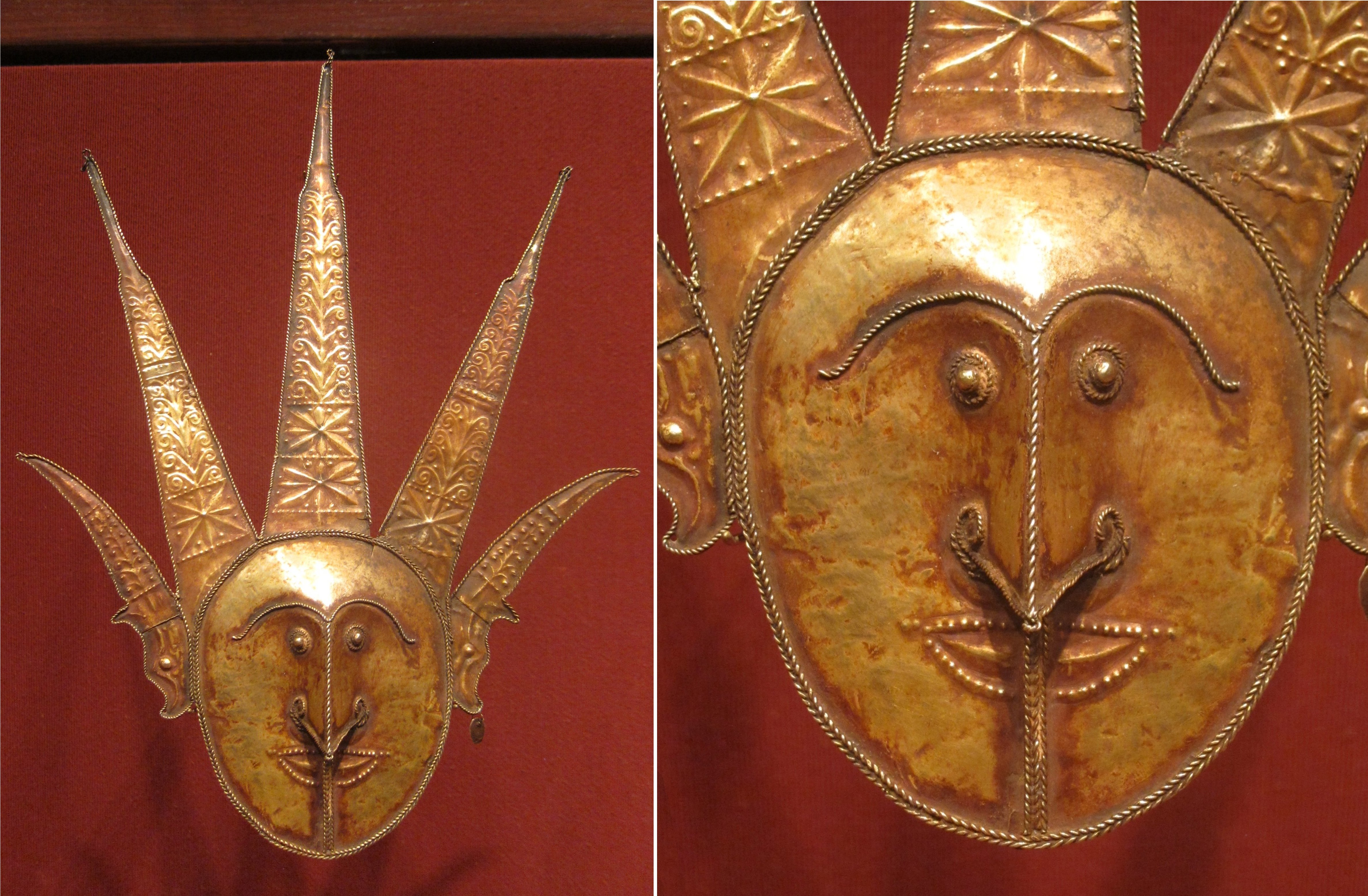
Headgear of Luang Island (19th century), Honolulu Museum of Art

Maluku, a group of islands within the Indonesian archipelago, has a variety of culture and customs expressed in music, tools, languages, dance, and art.

== Kalwedo ==
One of the many cultures is known as Kalwedo. Kalwedo is valid proof of ownership of indigenous peoples in Southwest Maluku (MBD). This ownership is joint ownership of common life. Kalwedo is rooted in the lives of indigenous peoples in the Babar archipelago and MBD. The Kalwedo cultural inheritance is expressed in a language game, customs, and discourse.

== Hawear ==
Hawear is a growing and prevailing culture in the public life of the Kei Islands, passed from one generation to the next. Folklore, folk, and a variety of written documents are among the means by which cultural treasures including Hawear are preserved.

== See also ==
- Baileo
